The parent article is at List of University of Michigan alumni

This is a partial list of notable alumni in law, government and public policy from the University of Michigan. Please refer also to the below list:

Legislators

Estefania Aldaba-Lim (Ph.D.), first female Filipino Cabinet secretary; social services and development secretary 1971–1977; first Filipino clinical psychologist; President of the Girl Scouts of the Philippines; first woman to become special ambassador to the United Nations (1979); UN Peace Medal Award
Justin Amash (B.A. 2002, J.D. 2005), lawyer, politician; U.S. Representative from Michigan's 3rd congressional district; libertarian-oriented maverick
Donald M. Baker (B.A., M.A. economics 1952, J.D. 1956), major force in federal legislation on labor, education and poverty of the 1960s, 1970s and 1980s; chief counsel for the Office of Economic Opportunity under Sargent Shriver during the Lyndon B. Johnson administration; oversaw such landmark legislation as the Occupational Safety and Health Act of 1970, the Employee Retirement Income Security Act of 1974, key additions to the Civil Rights Act, the Elementary and Secondary Education Act and many school busing, family planning, jobs and anti-poverty programs
Andrea Barthwell (M.D. 1980), Deputy Director for Demand Reduction at the Office of National Drug Control Policy (Drug Czar); resigned in July 2004 with an interest in running for United States Senate from Illinois
Alvin Morell Bentley (B.A. 1940, M.A. 1963), U.S. Representative from Michigan's 8th congressional district (1953–1961); wounded in the 1954 Capitol shooting incident; member of the Foreign Service
William J. "Bill" Bogaard (J.D. 1965), mayor of Pasadena, California (1984–1986; 1999–present); longest-serving mayor in city history
Howard L. Bost (Ph.D. 1955), historic architect of Medicare and job-related benefits for workers; U-M awarded him the nation's first doctorate in medical economics
Lyman James Briggs (M.A. in Physics, 1895), civil servant for the U.S. Government for 49 years; headed the Briggs Advisory Committee on Uranium; namesake of Lyman Briggs College at U-M
Arleigh Burke (MSE 1931), United States Navy admiral; World War II naval hero; served an unprecedented three terms as Chief of Naval Operations (1955–1961)
Anson Burlingame (1838–1841), Congressional Representative from Massachusetts; attended Detroit branch of the University of Michigan; served in the State senate in 1852; elected as a candidate of the American Party to the Thirty-fourth Congress and as a Republican to the Thirty-fifth and Thirty-sixth Congresses (March 4, 1855 – March 3, 1861); appointed Minister to Austria March 22, 1861, but was not accepted by the Austrian Government because of certain opinions he was known to entertain regarding Hungary and Sardinia; Minister to China from June 14, 1861, to November 21, 1867; appointed December 1, 1867, by the Chinese Government its ambassador to negotiate treaties with foreign powers
Charles W. Burson (B.A. in political science, 1966), Senior Professor of Practice at the Washington University School of Law; Executive Vice President, General Counsel and Secretary at Monsanto Company (2001–2006); Tennessee Attorney General (1988–1997); chief of staff to Vice President Al Gore (1997–2001)
Harry M. Daugherty (LL.B. 1881), United States Attorney General; famously campaign manager and close advisor to Warren G. Harding
Donald McDonald Dickinson (J.D. 1867), United States Postmaster General under Grover Cleveland
Gerrit John Diekema (LAW: JD 1883), Congressional Representative from Michigan; member of the State house of representatives 1885–1891, serving as speaker in 1889; mayor of Holland in 1895; chairman of the Michigan Republican State central committee 1900–1910; delegate to the Republican National Convention in 1896; member of the Spanish Treaty Claims Commission from 1901 until he resigned in 1907; chairman of the Republican State central committee in 1927; appointed United States Minister to the Netherlands by President Hoover on August 20, 1929, and served until his death in The Hague, Netherlands, December 20, 1930;
Gerald R. Ford (B.A. 1935, HLLD 1974), 38th President of the United States (1974–1977); 40th Vice President of the United States (1973–1974); Minority Leader of the United States House of Representatives (1965–1973); U.S. Representative from Michigan's 5th congressional district (1949–1973)
Harold Ford Jr. (J.D. 1996), U.S. Representative from the Memphis-based Tennessee's 9th congressional district (1997–2007)
Richard A. "Dick" Gephardt (J.D. 1965), President and CEO of the Gephardt Group lobbying firm; House Minority Leader (1995–2003); House Majority Leader (1989–1995); U.S. Representative from Missouri's 3rd congressional district (1977–2005); St. Louis city alderman (1971–1976); unsuccessfully sought the Democratic nomination for president in 1988 and 2004
Stephen Goldsmith (J.D.), Professor of Practice at the Harvard Kennedy School of Government; chair of the Corporation for National and Community Service; Deputy Mayor of New York City (2010–11); mayor of Indianapolis (1992–1999); district attorney for Marion County, Indiana (1979–1990)
Henry Thomas Hazard (LLD 1868), Mayor of Los Angeles (1889–1892)
Alexander W. Joel (J.D. 1987), Civil Liberties Protection Officer for the Office of the Director of National Intelligence
Philip Lader (M.A. History 1967), United States Ambassador to the United Kingdom (1997–2001); Administrator of the Small Business Administration (1994–1997); House Deputy Chief of Staff and Deputy Director for Management of the Office of Management and Budget (1993–1994)
Robert Meeropol (1969, M.A. 1970), attorney; founder and executive director of the Rosenberg Fund for Children (1990–present); son of Julius and Ethel Rosenberg
William L. Mitchell (J.D.), former Kansas state legislator;speaker of the Kansas House of Representatives 1960–1962; served in the Kansas House 1957–1962; chairman of the Kansas Corporation Commission 1963–1968
Julius Sterling Morton (A.B. 1854), United States Secretary of Agriculture under President Cleveland; created Arbor Day
Edward Charles Pierce (BA 1955; MED: MD 1959), politician and physician; elected to the Michigan State Senate from the state's eighteenth district in 1978, and held the seat through 1982
Lloyd Welch Pogue (LAW: JD 1926), "the nation's leading authority on civil aviation"; named assistant general counsel of the Civil Aeronautics Authority in 1938, then its general counsel and chief lawyer; in 1942, President Franklin Roosevelt named Welch to the Civil Aeronautics Board (now the FAA) and reappointed him chairman for four successive years.
Harvey S. Rosen (A.B. 1970), Chair of President Bush's Council of Economic Advisers; deputy assistant secretary for tax analysis in the Department of the Treasury under President George H.W. Bush 1989–1991
Joe Schwarz (B.A. History 1959), Republican U.S. Congressman, MI-7th (2005–2007); Michigan State Senator (1987–2002)
George Sutherland (LAW: 1883), Associate Justice of the Supreme Court
Lauren Underwood (BS, Nursing 2008), Democratic U.S. Congresswoman, IL-14 (Naperville/Chicago suburbs) 
Fred Upton (BA 1975), Republican U.S. Congressman, MI-6th (southwest Michigan)
Kapila Vatsyayan (MA), scholar of Indian classical dance; member of the Rajya Sabha (2006, 2007–present). The Rajya Sabha or Council of States is the upper house of the bicameral Parliament of India. 
James Franklin Ware (LAW: 1873), Wisconsin State Assemblyman and Senator

Governors and Lieutenant Governors
As of 2021, Michigan has matriculated 63 governors or lieutenant governors.

Michigan
Wilber Marion Brucker (A.B. 1916), 32nd Governor of Michigan 1931–1933; United States Secretary of the Army 1955–1961
John Cherry (MPA 1984), Lt. Governor of Michigan; former state senator
William Comstock (A.B. 1899), 33rd Governor of Michigan
Woodbridge N. Ferris (MD 1874), educator and politician; founder and president of the Ferris Industrial School (later Ferris State University); president of the Big Rapids Savings Bank; governor of Michigan (1913–1916); elected as a Democrat to the United States Senate in 1922 and served from 1923 until his death in 1928
Garlin Gilchrist II (born September 25, 1982) is an American politician and activist who is currently serving as lieutenant governor of Michigan.
Fred W. Green (LAW: 1898), mayor of Ionia, Michigan before he served as the 31st Governor of Michigan from 1927 to 1931
Martha Wright Griffiths (LAW: JD 1940), Congressional Representative; elected to the Michigan state house of representatives 1948–1952; elected as a Democrat to the Eighty-fourth and to the nine succeeding Congresses (1955–1974); lieutenant Governor of Michigan 1982–1991
George Griswold was an American politician and tenth Lieutenant Governor from the U. S. state of Michigan.
Alex Goresbeck (LAW: LLB 1893), 30th Governor of Michigan
Patrick Henry Kelley (LAW: JD 1900), Congressional Representative from Michigan; member of the state board of education 1901–1905; state superintendent of public instruction 1905–1907; Lieutenant Governor of Michigan 1907–1911; elected as a Republican to the Sixty-third and to the four succeeding Congresses (1913–1923)
Dwight May In 1842, he attended the Kalamazoo branch of the University of Michigan (now Kalamazoo College), entered the sophomore class in 1846, and graduated in 1849 from the classical department. In 1866, May was elected the 18th Lieutenant Governor of Michigan as well as trustee of the village of Kalamazoo. 
Joseph R. McLaughlin, entrepreneur and politician from Michigan; Lieutenant Governor 1895–1897
Kimber Cornellus "Kim" Sigler, 40th Governor of Michigan 1947–1949
Rick Snyder (LSA, LAW, BUS), 48th Governor of Michigan; former president and COO of Gateway Computers
Murray Delos Van Wagoner (COE: BA CE 1921), 38th Governor of Michigan 1941–1942
G. Mennen "Soapy" Williams (LAW: JD), six-term Democratic Governor of Michigan (1948–1960); Michigan Supreme Court Chief Justice
Edwin B. Winans (LAW), U.S. Representative; 22nd Governor of Michigan

Outside Michigan
Thomas Burton Adams Jr. was an American politician from the U.S. state of Florida. A Democrat, he served in the Florida Senate (1956–1960), as Secretary of State of Florida (1961–1971), and as the tenth Lieutenant Governor of Florida (1971–1975).
George Ariyoshi (J.D. 1952), third governor of Hawaii (1974–1986)
M. Cameron Ayres, Department of State; Corporate Intel, Specialized Placement Head, GCU: Global Corporation Unit Director, (2001-2021)
Theodore G. Bilbo was an American politician who twice served as governor of Mississippi (1916–20, 1928–32) and later was elected a U.S. Senator (1935–47). 
William John Bulow (LAW: JD 1893), Senator from South Dakota; member of State Senate 1899; mayor of Beresford 1912–1913; county judge of Union County, 1918; Governor of South Dakota 1927–1931; elected as a Democrat to the United States Senate in 1930; reelected in 1936 and served 1931–1943; chairman of Committee on the Civil Service (Seventy-third through Seventy-seventh Congresses)
David Francis Cargo (BA 1951, MA 1953; LAW: LLB 1957), Governor of New Mexico, 1967–71; New Mexico State House of Representatives Albuquerque (1963–67)
Fenimore Chatterton, Republican, governor of Wyoming (1903–1905)
Chase Addison Clark, Democrat, governor of Idaho (1941–1943)
Thomas Cuming (A.B. 1845) military officer; first Secretary of Nebraska Territory; twice was the territory's acting Governor, after the death of Francis Burt and after the resignation of Mark W. Izard
Cushman Kellogg Davis (AB 1857), governor of Minnesota (1874–1876); U.S. Senator (1887–1900)
Thomas E. Dewey (B.A. 1923), governor of New York (1943–1954); unsuccessfully ran as Republican nominee for president in 1944 and 1948
Frank Emerson (B.S. 1904), governor of Wyoming (1927–1931)
Ralph F. Gates (BA 1915; LAW: JD 1917), Governor of Indiana, 1945–49
John L. Gibbs was a Minnesota legislator, two-time Speaker of the Minnesota House of Representatives and the 14th Lieutenant Governor of Minnesota.
Joseph B. Gill was an American politician. Between 1893 and 1897 he served as Lieutenant Governor of Illinois.
Morley Isaac Griswold governor of Nevada	(1934–1935) 	Republican
Philip Hart was an American lawyer and politician.
Paul M. Herbert was an American politician of the Republicanparty who served three separate tenures as the 47th, 49th and 52nd Lieutenant Governor of Ohio. 
Francis Grant "Frank" Higgins, first native-born person from Montana to become a member of the state's bar and of its legislature; served in the Montana House of Representatives; mayor of Missoula, Montana in 1892; fourth Lieutenant Governor of Montana, 1901–1905
Lyman Underwood Humphrey, Republican, governor of Kansas (1889–1893)
Arthur Mastick Hyde, Republican, governor of Missouri (1921–1925)
John N. Irwin, businessman; diplomat; Mayor of Keokuk, Iowa; Governor of Idaho Territory; Governor of Arizona Territory; U.S. Minister to Portugal
Gideon S. Ives was an American politician who served as Mayor of St. Peter, Minnesota, Minnesota State Senator and as the 11th Lieutenant Governor of Minnesota.
Clement Field Kimball (LAW), Lieutenant Governor of Iowa 1925–1928
Elbert L. Lampson, 21st Lieutenant Governor of Ohio; former State Senator
Washington Ellsworth Lindsey, Republican, governor of New Mexico (1917–1919)
Oren Ethelbirt Long (AB 1916), Senator from Hawaii; superintendent of public instruction, Territory of Hawaii 1934–1946; secretary of Territory of Hawaii 1946–1951; appointed Governor of Territory of Hawaii 1951–1953; member and vice chairman, Hawaii Statehood Commission 1954–1956; territorial senator, Territory of Hawaii 1956–1959; elected as a Democrat to the United States Senate on July 28, 1959; upon the admission of Hawaii as a State into the Union on August 21, 1959, drew the four-year term beginning on that day and ending January 3, 1963
Ernest Whitworth Marland (LAW: JD 1893), Congressional Representative from Oklahoma; elected as a Democrat to the Seventy-third Congress (1933–1935); elected Governor of Oklahoma in 1934 for the four-year term commencing January 14, 1935
George de Rue Meiklejohn (LAW: JD 1880), Congressional Representative from Nebraska; member of the State senate 1884–1888 and served as its president 1886–1888; chairman of the Republican State convention of 1887; chairman of the Republican State central committee in 1887 and 1888; Lieutenant Governor of Nebraska 1889–1891; elected as a Republican to the Fifty-third and Fifty-fourth Congresses (1893–1897); appointed by President McKinley as Assistant Secretary of War April 14, 1897, and served until March 1901, when he resigned
Julius Sterling Morton, appointed Secretary of Nebraska Territory by President James Buchanan on July 12, 1858, a position he held until 1861; Acting Governor of Nebraska 1858–1859
Culbert Olson, lawyer; Democratic Party member; Governor of California (1939–1943)
Walter Marcus Pierce (MDNG), Congressional Representative from Oregon; engaged in banking and in the power and light business 1898–1907; served in the Oregon senate 1903–1907 and 1917–1921; Governor of Oregon 1923–1927; member of the board of regents of Oregon State College 1905–1927; elected as a Democrat to the Seventy-third and to the four succeeding Congresses (1933–1943)
Ridgley C. Powers, governor of Mississippi	(1871–1874)
Donald Stuart Russell, Democrat, governor of South Carolina	 (1963–1965)
John Franklin Shafroth, governor of Colorado (1909–1913)
Robert Theodore Stafford (AB), Congressional Representative and a Senator from Vermont; deputy State attorney general 1953–1955; State attorney general 1955–1957; lieutenant Governor 1957–1959; Governor of Vermont 1959–1961; elected as a Republican to the Eighty-seventh Congress in 1960; reelected to the five succeeding Congresses and served from January 3, 1961, until his resignation from the House of Representatives, September 16, 1971, to accept appointment the same day to the United States Senate to fill the vacancy caused by the death of Winston L. Prouty; elected by special election January 7, 1972, to complete the unexpired term ending January 3, 1977; reelected in 1976 and again in 1982 for the term ending January 3, 1989;
William Story, federal judge; seventh Lieutenant Governor of Colorado, serving 1891–1893 under John Long Routt
Charles Spalding Thomas (LAW: JD 1871), Senator from Colorado; member of the Democratic National Committee 1884–1896; Governor of Colorado 1899–1901; elected as a Democrat to the United States Senate in 1913 to fill the vacancy caused by the death of Charles J. Hughes, Jr.; reelected in 1914, and served 1913–1921; chairman, Committee on Woman Suffrage (Sixty-third and Sixty-fourth Congresses), Committee on Coast Defenses (Sixty-fifth Congress), Committee on Pacific Railroads (Sixty-sixth Congress);
Harriett Woods (AB 1949), Missouri's first female lieutenant governor; a Democrat; Missouri's lieutenant governor in 1984 and served one term as the state's No. 2 executive; previously served eight years in the state Senate, two years on a state transportation commission and eight years on the University City Council; first female editor of the U-M newspaper
Richard Yates, Republican governor of Illinois (1901–1905)

Local government
Saul Anuzis, Republican Party leader from Michigan; national chairman for the Save American Jobs Project on the American Solutions team; chairman of the Michigan Republican Party 2005–2009; candidate for national chairman of the Republican National Committee in 2009
 Henry Bodenstab, Wisconsin State Senator (1909–1912)
 Carol A. Buettner, Wisconsin State Senator (1987–1991)
 Rufus Davis, Mayor of Camilla, Georgia (2016–)
Mike Duggan, incumbent mayor of Detroit, Michigan (2013–)
 Craig Greenberg (born 1973), businessman, lawyer, and politician; Mayor-elect of Louisville
Richard J Kaplan, incumbent Mayor of Lauderhill, Florida  (1998–)
Wade Kapszukiewicz, 58th mayor of Toledo, Ohio (2018- )
 John McMullen, Wisconsin State Senator (1895–1898)
 H.H.C. Miller (A.B. 1868, A.M. 1871), mayor of Evanston (1883–1891)
 Robert E. Minahan, Mayor of Green Bay, Wisconsin (1904–1907)
 John M. Potter, Wisconsin State Senator (1960–1964)
 Laura Spurr, Chairwoman of the Nottawaseppi Huron Band of Potawatomi (2000–2001, 2003–2010)
 Dwight Tillery, mayor of Cincinnati, Ohio (1991–1993)
Nathan Triplett, Mayor of East Lansing, Michigan (2013-2016)

Ambassadors
As of 2022, Michigan has matriculated 64 Ambassadors who served as Ambassador in more than 72 countries.

H. Gardner Ackley (MA, PhD), former Henry Carter Adams Distinguished University Professor Emeritus of Political Economy; on U-M faculty for 43 years; leader in national economic affairs for several decades, including serving as adviser to Presidents Kennedy and Johnson; an expert on the Italian economy, he was also ambassador to Italy
Robert Worth Bingham, newspaper publisher and U.S. ambassador to Great Britain. Bingham was graduated from the Bingham School in 1888 and attended The University of North Carolina from 1888 to 1891. He received the LL.B. degree from the University of Louisville in 1897. After a year of postgraduate study at the University of Michigan, Bingham commenced practice in Louisville, Ky. 
Donald Blome is an American diplomat currently serving as United States Ambassador to Tunisia. He is a graduate of the University of Michigan as well as of its law school; nominated in 2021 to serve as Ambassador to Pakistanl;
Paul H. Boeker (MA Economics), United States Ambassador to Jordan (1984–87); Director of Foreign Service Institute (1980–83); United States Ambassador to Bolivia (1977–80)
Anson Burlingame, United States Ambassador to China (1861–70)
Lawrence E. Butler (BUS: MBA), US Ambassador to Macedonia (2002–05); UN Official Principal Deputy High Representative in Bosnia-Herzegovina (2005–present); US Ambassador to Macedonia (2002–05); US National Security Council Staff, Director of European Affairs (1997–99); US Ambassador to Serbia ad interim (1995–96); US State Department Deputy Chief of Mission, Belgrade, Serbia-Montenegro (−1995); US State Department Deputy Chief of Mission, Copenhagen, Denmark (past); US State Department Deputy Chief of Mission, Dublin, Ireland (past)
William L. Cargo (B.A. Class of 1933), appointed U.S. Ambassador to Nepal in 1973
Vicente Blanco Gaspar, ambassador of Spain
Luis CdeBaca (J.D. 1993), Ambassador-at-Large to Monitor and Combat Trafficking in Persons at the United States Department of State; lead trial counsel in the largest slavery prosecution in U.S. history
Jae-ho Chung (Ph.D.), a professor of international relations and director of the Institute for Chinese Studies at Seoul National University, was nominated by South Korean President Yoon Suk-yeol as the new ambassador to China in June 2022. 
Brutus J. Clay II (COE: 1868), appointed Minister to Switzerland in 1905, served until 1910
E. William Crotty (J.D.) Ambassador to Barbados, Antigua and Barbuda, the Commonwealth of Dominica, Grenada, St. Kitts and Nevis, Saint Lucia, St. Vincent and the Grenadines. On November 19, 1998, E. William Crotty was sworn in as U.S. Ambassador to Barbados. Born on June 28, 1931, in Claremont, New Hampshire, Mr. Crotty graduated from Dartmouth College with a B.A. in economics. He earned a J.D. from University of Michigan Law School, where he was a Frederick L. Leckie Scholar. Mr. Crotty received a Masters of Law in Taxation from the New York University Law School.
John R. Dawson (B.A. 1973), United States Ambassador to Peru 2002–03
Gerrit J. Diekema (LAW), appointed United States Minister to the Netherlands by President Herbert Hoover in 1929, and served until his death in The Hague, Netherlands
Robert F. Ellsworth (J.D. 1949), U.S. Representative from Kansas (1961–1969); United States Permanent Representative to NATO (1969–1971)
Brian James Proetel Fall, Britain's Ambassador to Russia (1992–95)
Homer S. Ferguson (B.A. 1913), judge of the United States Court of Military Appeals (1956–1971); Ambassador to the Philippines (1955–1956); judge of the United States Court of Military Appeals at Washington, D.C., 1956–1971; U.S. Senator from Michigan (1943–1955); circuit judge of the circuit court for Wayne County, Michigan (1929–1942)
Robert E. Fritts (B.A.) In 1974 at age 39, he became the then-youngest ambassador in the history of the Foreign Service when assigned to Rwanda, a record he wryly recalled “lasted about six months.” He later served as the U.S. ambassador to Ghana during a period of fluctuating bilateral relations.
John Godfrey (diplomat) (M.A.) Nominee for Ambassador Extraordinary and Plenipotentiary to the Republic of the Sudan
James Goodby (MDNG: 1951–1952), United States Ambassador to Finland (1980–1981)
David Hermelin (BUS: BBA 1958), entrepreneur; philanthropist; former United States Ambassador to Norway; Ross School benefactor
Pete Hoekstra (MBA)is a Dutch-American politician who served as the United States Ambassador to the Netherlands from January 10, 2018, to January 17, 2021.
Aubrey Hooks (MA 1984), US Ambassador to Côte d'Ivoire
John Nichol Irwin, businessman; politician; diplomat; Mayor of Keokuk, Iowa; Governor of Idaho Territory; Governor of Arizona Territory; U.S. Minister to Portugal
Susan S. Jacobs, former U.S. Ambassador to Papua New Guinea, the Solomon Islands and Vanuatu
Richard Kauzlarich (MA), US Ambassador to Azerbaijan 1994–1997 and to Bosnia and Herzegovina 1997–1999
Leo J. Keena, appointed by President Franklin D. Roosevelt and served as the United States Ambassador to Honduras 1935–1937; United States Ambassador to South Africa 1937–1942
W. Robert Kohorst (J.D.) of California to be Ambassador Extraordinary and Plenipotentiary of the United States of America to the Republic of Croatia. He earned a J.D. from the University of Michigan Law School.
David Kostelancik (MA), Ambassador to Hungary. Mr. Kostelancik has served as Chargé d'Affaires, ad interim of the Mission since January 20, 2017. From August, 2014 until August, 2015 he served as the Senior State Department Advisor to the Congressional Helsinki Commission. From July, 2012 until August, 2014 he served as Director of the Office of Russian Affairs in the Department of State's Bureau of European and Eurasian Affairs
Philip Lader (LSA: MA), United States Ambassador to the United Kingdom 1997–2001
Melvyn Levitsky (BA), retired career Minister in the U.S. Foreign Service; teaches international relations at the University of Michigan's Gerald R. Ford School of Public Policy; Senior Fellow of the School's International Policy Center; had 35-year career as a U.S. diplomat, Ambassador to Brazil 1994–98; former Assistant Secretary of State for International Narcotics Matters, Executive Secretary of the State Department, Ambassador to Bulgaria, Deputy Director of the Voice of America, and Deputy Assistant Secretary of State for Human Rights
María Dora Victoriana Mejía Marulanda (B.A., M.A.), Ambassador of Colombia to Sweden
Fenton R. McCreery, Ambassador to Honduras
Douglas L. McElhaney (BA International Affairs), US Ambassador to Bosnia-Herzegovina 2004–present; entered the Foreign Service in 1975
Joseph R. McLaughlin, entrepreneur; politician; Lieutenant Governor of Michigan 1895–1897
William Bryant Milam (MA 1970), US Ambassador to Pakistan, 1998–2001
Earl R. Miller, U.S. Ambassador to Botswana Term of Appointment: 12/18/2014 to present Mr. Miller was sworn in as the U.S. Ambassador to the Republic of Botswana on December 18, 2014. Ambassador Miller, a career member of the U.S. Senior Foreign Service, joined the Department of State in 1987
David Miller, Jr. (J.D.) He served as the United States ambassador to Tanzania from 1981 to 1984 and to Zimbabwe from 1984 to 1986. 
Thomas J. Miller (PhD 1975), U.S. ambassador to Greece; U.S. ambassador to Bosnia-Herzegovina
José Teodoro Moscoso Mora (B.A. 1932), named Moscoso ambassador to Venezuela by President Kennedy in 1961
Robert G. Neumann (Ph.D. 1946), former United States Ambassador to Afghanistan 1969–73; Director, Institute for the Study of Diplomacy, Georgetown University (1976–81); US Ambassador to Saudi Arabia (June 1981 to July 1981), United States Ambassador to Morocco (1973–76)
David George Newton (MA 1970), US Ambassador to Iraq, 1984–88
Elliot Northcott, Ambassador to Colombia and Venezuela
Thomas J.O'Brien (LAW), ambassador to Denmark, Japan and Italy
Susan D. Page (A.B.), nominated in 2011 by President Obama to the post of U.S. Ambassador to South Sudan
Thomas W. Palmer, appointed US Minister to Spain in 1889 by President Benjamin Harrison; served 1889–1890
Mark A. Pekala (A.B. 1981), U.S. ambassador to Latvia in 2012
Nancy Bikoff Pettit (M.A.), Ambassador Pettit was confirmed by the Senate on June 24, 2015, as the Ambassador to the Republic of Latvia. She is a career member of the Foreign Service, Class of Minister Counselor. Prior to arriving in Riga, she served as Director of the Office of Western European Affairs in the Bureau of European and Eurasian Affairs, a position she held from 2013 to 2015.
Peter A. Prahar (B.A.), former Air Force translator; ambassador to the FSM
William E. Quinby, newspaper publisher; diplomat; United States Ambassador to the Netherlands
Clark T. Randt, Jr. (LAW: JD 1975), US Ambassador to China, 2001–2009
Kenneth Salazar confirmed as Ambassador to Mexico in August 2021.
Joseph C. Satterthwaite (B.A. M.A.) served as United States Ambassador to Sri Lanka from 1949 to 1952, Head of the U.S. Legation at Tangier from 1953 to 1955, and as United States Ambassador to Burma from April 1955 to April 1957.
Margaret Scobey (Ph.D.), US Ambassador to Syria; US Ambassador to Egypt as of 2008
Marshall D. Shulman (A.B. 1937), principal architect of Columbia University's Russian studies program; longest serving director of the Russian Institute at Columbia; ambassador as the principal adviser on Soviet matters to Secretary of State Cyrus R. Vance in the Carter administration; speechwriter for Secretary of State Dean G. Acheson; author of Stalin's Foreign Policy Reappraised (1963), a staple in Soviet studies for many years; his 1966 book of lectures, Beyond the Cold War, foreshadowed the détente between the Soviet Union and the US that occurred during the Nixon administration
William Graves Sharp (LAW: JD 1881), Congressional Representative from Ohio; elected as a Democrat to the Sixty-first, Sixty-second, and Sixty-third Congresses; served 1909–1914, when he resigned to become Ambassador to France, in which capacity he served until April 14, 1919
William Story, federal judge; seventh Lieutenant Governor of Colorado, serving 1891–1893 under John Long Routt
Louis B. Susman (A.B.), former Vice Chairman of Citigroup Capital Markets; nominated as Ambassador to Great Britain in 2009
Edwin Uhl, Acting US Secretary of State and Ambassador to Germany during the Cleveland Administration
Jack Hood Vaughn (BA, MA), second Director of the United States Peace Corps; ambassador to Colombia and Panama
Gary Waissi (COE: Ph.D.), dean of ASU's School of Global Management and Leadership at the West campus; Knight, First Class, of the Order of the Lion of Finland in 2006
Howard Kent Walker, diplomat; Foreign Service officer; former United States Ambassador to Togo, Madagascar, and Comoros
Charles B. Warren (B.A. 1891), U.S. Ambassador to Japan 1921–1922; Ambassador to Mexico in 1924
Ronald N. Weiser (BUS: BBA 1966), US Ambassador to Slovak Republic; founder of McKinley Associates
G. Mennen Williams (J.D.), Ambassador to the Philippines; heir to a personal grooming products fortune, he was known as "Soapy"
Susan L. Ziadeh (Ph.D.) has enjoyed a 23-year career with the U.S. Department of State where she most recently served as the Deputy Assistant Secretary of State for Arabian Peninsula Affairs in the Bureau of Near Eastern Affairs (2014-2016). From May–October 2016, Amb. Ziadeh served as NEA Acting Principal Deputy Assistant Secretary. She is a career member of the Senior Foreign Service, class of Minister-Counselor, and served as the U.S. Ambassador to the State of Qatar from 2011 to 2014.

Federal Reserve, FDIC, OCC, and Treasury
William Duscharme "Pink Cheeks" Cochran, director of the Federal Reserve Bank of Minneapolis 1936–1950, including five years as Deputy Chairman, 1946–1950
John C. Dugan (A.B. 1977), 29th Comptroller of the Currency as of 2005
Naomi Feldman, Israel's cabinet, on October 5 of 2021, approved her appointment to the Bank of Israel's monetary policy committee, the central bank said.
Howard Flight (BUS: MBA), British MP; holds 11 directorships; in 2001, he was appointed Shadow Paymaster General; in 2002 was promoted to Shadow Chief Secretary to the Treasury
G. Edward Griffin (BA, 1953), author of The Creature from Jekyll Island (1994), which promotes conspiracy theories about the Federal Reserve System; also writes about the health care system
William C. Handorf (BUS: MBA 1967), member, board of directors, Federal Reserve Bank of Richmond
George M. Humphrey (BA, JD), United States Secretary of the Treasury during the Eisenhower administration
Donald Kohn (Ph.D. 1971), joined the Federal Reserve System in 1970; member of Board of Governors since 2002, Vice-chairman 2006–2010
Robb LaKritz (B.A. 1994), Special Assistant and Advisor to the Deputy U.S. Treasury Secretary, appointed by President George W. Bush 
Timothy D. Leulitte (BUS: MBA 1976), chairman of the board, Federal Reserve Bank of Chicago
Rob Portman (LAW: JD 1984), former United States Trade Representative, a post carrying the rank of Ambassador; nominated by President Bush and confirmed by the US Senate in 2006, as the Director of the United States Office of Management and Budget; Senator elect from Ohio in 2010
Martha Seger (BUS: BBA 1954, MBA 1955, Ph.D. 1971), former governor of the Federal Reserve Bank
L. William Seidman (BUS: MBA 1949, former head of the FDIC; vice chairman and CFO of the Phelps Dodge Corporation (1977–1982); managing partner of Seidman & Seidman, certified public accountants (1968–1974)
Daniel Tarullo (LAW: JD 1977), member of the Board of Governors, U.S. Federal Reserve Board; appointed by President Obama in 2009; former Assistant to President Clinton for International Economic Policy and Deputy Assistant for Economic Policy
Nancy Teeters (July 29, 1930 – November 17, 2014) was the first woman to serve on the Federal Reserve Board of Governors. Appointed by President Jimmy Carter, she served from 1978 to 1984.

Judiciary
J. Leroy Adair (LAW: JD 1911), Congressional Representative from Illinois; member of the State senate 1928–1932; elected as a Democrat to the Seventy-third and Seventy-fourth Congresses (1933–1937); appointed United States district judge for the southern district of Illinois in 1937 by President Franklin D. Roosevelt and served until his death in 1956
Charles H. Aldrich (A.B. 1875), the Solicitor General of the United States
Prudence Carter Beatty, US Bankruptcy Judge for the Southern District of New York
George G. Bingham (LLB 1880), judge in Oregon, dean of Willamette University College of Law
Brian Blanchard (BA 1980), Judge of the Wisconsin Court of Appeals
Jackson Burton Chase (LAW: LLB 1913), Congressional Representative from Nebraska; assistant attorney general of Nebraska in 1921 and 1922; member of the State House of Representatives in 1933 and 1934; served as a major, Judge Advocate General's Department, 1942–1945; chairman of Nebraska Liquor Control Commission in 1945 and 1946; judge of the fourth judicial district court of Nebraska, 1946–1954; elected as a Republican to the Eighty-fourth Congress (1955–1957); again elected judge of the fourth judicial district court of Nebraska 1956–1960
John Logan Chipman (1843–1845), Congressional Representative from Michigan; attorney of the police board of Detroit 1867–1879; elected judge of the superior court of Detroit 1879; reelected in 1885 and served until 1887, when he resigned, having been elected to Congress; elected as a Democrat to the Fiftieth and to the three succeeding Congresses; served from 1887 until his death in 1893
George Pierre Codd (AB 1891), Congressional Representative from Michigan; mayor of Detroit in 1905 and 1906; circuit judge of Wayne County 1911–1921; regent of the University of Michigan in 1910 and 1911; elected as a Republican to the Sixty-seventh Congress (1921–1923); again elected circuit judge of Wayne County in 1924 and served until his death in 1927
Avern Cohn (LAW: JD 1949), district judge for the United States District Court, Eastern District of Michigan, appointed by President Jimmy Carter in 1979
Louis Convers Cramton (LAW: JD 1899), Congressional Representative from Michigan; law clerk of the State senate three terms; deputy commissioner of railroads of Michigan in 1907; secretary of the Michigan Railroad Commission from September 1907 to January 1, 1909; member of the State house of representatives in 1909 and 1910; elected as a Republican to the Sixty-third and to the eight succeeding Congresses (1913–1931); circuit judge of the fortieth judicial circuit 1934–1941
Shepard J. Crumpacker, Jr. (LAW: JD 1941), Congressional Representative from Indiana; elected as a Republican to the Eighty-second, Eighty-third, and Eighty-fourth Congresses (1951–1957); appointed judge of the St. Joseph Superior Court and served 1977–1985
Marc Dann (B.A. 1984), 47th attorney general of Ohio
Harry Micajah Daugherty (LAW: LL.B), Ohio Republican political insider; Attorney General of the United States under Presidents Harding and Coolidge
Cristobal C. Duenas (LAW: JD 1952), judge of the U.S. District Court of Guam; judge of the Island Court of Guam; previously director of the Department of Land Management
Robert Emory Evans (LAW: JD 1886), Congressional Representative from Nebraska; prosecuting attorney of Dakota County in 1895; resigned to become judge of the eighth judicial district, in which capacity he served from 1895 to 1899; president of the Nebraska State Bar Association in 1919; elected as a Republican to the Sixty-sixth and Sixty-seventh Congresses (1919–1923); elected judge of the supreme court from the third district of Nebraska in 1924
Homer Samuel Ferguson (AB 1913), Senator from Michigan; circuit judge of the circuit court for Wayne County, 1929–1942; elected as a Republican to the United States Senate in 1942; reelected in 1948 and served 1943–1955; Ambassador to the Philippines 1955–1956; judge of the United States Court of Military Appeals at Washington, D.C., 1956–1971
George Ford (LAW: JD 1869), Congressional Representative from Indiana; elected as a Democrat to the Forty-ninth Congress (1885–1887); elected judge of the superior court of St. Joseph County in 1914
Ralph M. Freeman (LAW: LL.B. 1926), Judge in the U.S. District Court for the Eastern District of Michigan; nominated by President Dwight D. Eisenhower in 1954; chief judge 1967–1972; assumed senior status in 1973
Ronald M. Gould (LAW: 1973), federal appeals judge; has served on the Ninth Circuit Court of Appeals since 1999; nominated by President Bill Clinton, confirmed by the United States Senate on November 17, and received his commission on November 22
Barzillai Gray (AB: 1845), judge
Byron Berry Harlan (LAW: JD 1909; LS&A: 1911), Congressional Representative from Ohio; elected as a Democrat to the Seventy-second and to the three succeeding Congresses (1931–1939); chairman, Committee on Revision of the Laws (Seventy-second and Seventy-third Congresses); appointed judge of the Tax Court of the United States in 1946 to his death in 1949
James Harvey (LAW: LLB 1948), Congressional Representative from Michigan; elected as a Republican to the Eighty-seventh and to the six succeeding Congresses (1961–1974); appointed by President Richard Nixon as a United States District Court judge for the Eastern District, Michigan, 1974–1984; United States Senior District judge, 1984–2002
Guy Tresillian Helvering (LAW: JD 1906), Congressional Representative from Kansas; elected as a Democrat to the Sixty-third, Sixty-fourth, and Sixty-fifth Congresses (1913–1919); Democratic State chairman 1930–1934; mayor of Salina from February 15, 1926, until his resignation on December 8, 1930; State highway director in 1931 and 1932; appointed Commissioner of Internal Revenue by President Franklin D. Roosevelt in 1933 and served until his appointment as a Federal district judge for Kansas in 1943, in which capacity he was serving at the time of his death in 1946
Douglas Woodruff Hillman (LAW: JD 1948), practiced law in Grand Rapids for 30 years before President Carter appointed him to the federal court in 1979; retired from the bench in 2002
Jay Abel Hubbell (AB 1853), Congressional Representative from Michigan; prosecuting attorney of Houghton County 1861–1867; elected as a Republican to the Forty-third and to the four succeeding Congresses (1873–1883); chairman, Committee on Expenditures in the Department of the Interior (Forty-seventh Congress); member of the State senate 1885–1887; served as circuit judge of the twelfth judicial circuit from 1894 to 1899, when he resigned
William Leonard Hungate (MDNG), Congressional Representative from Missouri; special assistant attorney general 1958–1964; elected simultaneously as a Democrat to the Eighty-eighth and to the Eighty-ninth Congress by special election, to fill the vacancy caused by the death of United States Representative Clarence Cannon, and reelected to the five succeeding Congresses (1964–1977); professor, University of Missouri, St. Louis, 1977–1979; justice, United States district judge for the eastern district of Missouri, 1979–1992; president, American Bar Association's National Conference of Federal Trial Judges, 1985–1986
Edwin William Keightley (LAW: JD 1865), Congressional Representative from Michigan; appointed and subsequently elected judge of the fifteenth judicial circuit of Michigan in 1876 and served until 1877, having been elected to Congress; elected as a Republican to the Forty-fifth Congress (1877–1879); appointed by President Hayes Third Auditor of the United States Treasury Department and served from 1879 to 1885, when he resigned
Moses Pierce Kinkaid (LAW: JD 1876), Congressional Representative from Nebraska; member of the State senate in 1883; district judge 1887–1900; elected as a Republican to the Fifty-eighth and to the nine succeeding Congresses and served from 1903 until his death in 1922; chairman, Committee on Irrigation of Arid Lands (Sixty-sixth and Sixty-seventh Congresses)
Carolyn N. Lerner (born January 13, 1965) is an American lawyer from Washington, D.C., who is a Judge-designate of the United States Court of Federal Claims.
William Lewis (MDNG), Congressional Representative from Kentucky; studied law at the University of Kentucky at Lexington and at U-M; member of State House of Representatives in 1900 and 1901; Commonwealth attorney 1904–1909; circuit judge of the twenty-seventh judicial district of Kentucky 1909–1922 and 1928–1934; elected as a Republican to the Eightieth Congress to fill the vacancy caused by the death of John Marshall Robsion and served 1948–1949
Gordon Myse (LAW: LLB 1960), Judge of the Wisconsin Court of Appeals
James Carson Needham (LAW: JD 1889), Congressional Representative from California; elected as a Republican to the Fifty-sixth and to the six succeeding Congresses (1899–1913); appointed judge of the superior court of California in 1919; elected to the same office in 1920 to fill an unexpired term; reelected in 1922 and again in 1926, and served until 1935
Darleen Ortega (LAW: JD 1989), judge on the Oregon Court of Appeals
Samuel Ritter Peters (LAW: JD 1867), Congressional Representative from Kansas; mayor of Memphis in 1873; elected a member of the State senate in 1874 and served until his resignation in March 1875; appointed and subsequently elected judge of the ninth judicial district and served from 1875 until 1883, when he resigned; elected as a Republican to the Forty-eighth and to the three succeeding Congresses (1883–1891); postmaster of Newton 1898–1910; editor of the Newton Daily Kansan-Republican in 1899
Rosemary S. Pooler (LAW: JD), U.S. federal judge; appointed in 1990 as a Justice for the Fifth Judicial District Supreme Court; appointed to the federal bench by President Bill Clinton, serving 1994–1998 as federal district judge in the Northern District of New York; received her current appointment as a Judge on the United States Court of Appeals for the Second Circuit in 1998
Joseph Very Quarles (AB 1966; LAW: JD 1867), Senator from Wisconsin; mayor of Kenosha 1876; member of state assembly 1879; member of state senate 1880–1882; elected as a Republican to the United States Senate and served 1899–1905; chairman, Committee on Transportation Routes to the Seaboard (Fifty-sixth Congress), Committee on the Census (Fifty-seventh and Fifty-eighth Congresses); appointed United States district judge for the eastern district of Wisconsin by President Theodore Roosevelt in 1905, and served until his death in 1911
Ozora P. Stearns (AB 1858, LAW: JD 1860), Senator from Minnesota; mayor of Rochester 1866–1868; served in the Union Army during the Civil War as a lieutenant, and then colonel; elected as a Republican to the United States Senate in 1871 and served until 1871; judge of the eleventh judicial district of Minnesota 1874–1895; regent of the University of Minnesota at Minneapolis 1890–1895
Larry D. Tompson (LAW: 1974), Deputy United States Attorney General
Carl May Weideman (MDNG), Congressional Representative from Michigan; attended the public schools and the University of Michigan at Ann Arbor from 1914 until the outbreak of the First World War; delegate to the Democratic State conventions 1932–1944 and to the Democratic National Convention in 1940; elected as a Democrat to the Seventy-third Congress (19331935); circuit judge for the third judicial circuit of Michigan 1950–1968

Justices: Appeals and Circuit Courts
More than 75 Michigan alumni have served on Appeals or Circuit Courts.

G. Gordon Atcheson (BA) Judge of the Kansas Court of Appeals
Francis E. Baker (BA) JudgeSenior Judge of the United States District Court for the District of Arizona of the United States Court of Appeals for the Seventh Circuit
Jane M. Beckering (BA) she is a judge of the 3rd District of the Michigan Court of Appeals.
Corinne A. Beckwith (LAW) Associate Judge of the District of Columbia Court of Appeals
Richard Bilby (LAW)  Senior Judge of the United States District Court for the District of Arizona
Bruce D. Black (LAW) was a judge on the New Mexico Court of Appeals from 1991 to 1995.
Brian Blanchard (BA) Judge of the Wisconsin Court of Appeals District IV
Charles D. Breital (BA) Chief Judge of the New York Court of Appeals
Bruce Bromley (BA) was appointed by Governor Thomas E. Dewey to the New York Court of Appeals
Bailey Brown (AB) Senior Judge of the United States Court of Appeals for the Sixth Circuit
John Robert Brown (LAW) Senior Judge of the United States Court of Appeals for the Fifth Circuit
Tovah R. Calderon (BA) District of Columbia Court of Appeals
Thomas Cane (BBA) Cane was a Wisconsin Circuit Court Judge from 1972 until his appointment to the Court of Appeals in 1981. He later served as a Presiding Judge from 1984 to 1998. 
John Emmett Carland (BA) Judge of the United States Court of Appeals for the Eighth Circuit
Lester LeFevre Cecil (LAW) Senior Judge of the United States Court of Appeals for the Sixth Circuit
Margaret Chutich (LAW) Associate Judge of the Minnesota Court of Appeals
Leroy John Contie Jr. (LAW) Senior Judge of the United States Court of Appeals for the Sixth Circuit
John Hazelton Cotteral (BA) Judge of the United States Court of Appeals for the Tenth Circuit
Sean Cox (BGS) Judge of the United States District Court for the Eastern District of Michigan
Robert Danhof (LAW) In 1969, Danhof was appointed to the Michigan Court of Appeals and served as Chief judge. 
William R. Day (BS) Judge of the United States Court of Appeals for the Sixth Circuit
Pat DeWine (LAW) won a seat on the 1st District Ohio District Courts of Appeals in 2012
Joshua Deahl (LAW) Associate Judge of the District of Columbia Court of Appeals
Rebecca Duncan (LAW) served on the Oregon Court of Appeals from 2010 to 2017.
David M. Ebel (LAW) Senior Judge of the United States Court of Appeals for the Tenth Circuit
Harry T. Edwards (LAW) Senior Judge of the United States Court of Appeals for the District of Columbia Circuit
Albert J. Engel Jr. (LAW) Senior Judge of the United States Court of Appeals for the Sixth Circuit
Homer S. Ferguson (LAW) Judge of the United States Court of Appeals for the Armed Forces
John Warner Fitzgerald (LAW) Fitzgerald practiced in the law firm of Fitzgerald & Wirbel until he was elected to the Michigan Court of Appeals in 1964.
William Ball Gilbert (LAW) Judge of the United States Court of Appeals for the Ninth Circuit
Ronald M. Gould (LAW) Judge of the United States Court of Appeals for the Ninth Circuit
Roger Gregory (LAW) Chief Judge of the United States Court of Appeals for the Fourth Circuit
Richard Allen Griffin (LAW) Judge of the United States Court of Appeals for the Sixth Circuit
Ralph B. Guy Jr. (LAW) Presiding Judge of the United States Foreign Intelligence Surveillance Court of Review
Amalya Lyle Kearse (LAW) Senior Judge of the United States Court of Appeals for the Second Circuit
Cornelia Groefsema Kennedy (LAW) Senior Judge of the United States Court of Appeals for the Sixth Circuit
Shiro Kashiwa (LAW) Judge of the United States Court of Appeals for the Federal Circuit
W. Wallace Kent (LAW) Judge of the United States Court of Appeals for the Sixth Circuit
Raymond Kethledge (LAW) Judge of the United States Court of Appeals for the Sixth Circuit
Noël A. Kramer (LAW) Associate Judge of the District of Columbia Court of Appeals
Amy Ronanye Krause (BA) is a judge of the Michigan Court of appeals 4th District.
Charles Levin (judge) (LAW) Judge of the Michigan Court of Appeals
Thomas Francis McAllister (LAW) Senior Judge of the United States Court of Appeals for the Sixth Circuit
Susan Bieke Neilson (AB)  Neilson was nominated to a Michigan seat on the United States Court of Appeals for the Sixth Circuit 
Helen W. Nies (LAW) Senior Judge of the United States Court of Appeals for the Federal Circuit
David McKeague (LAW) Senior Judge of the United States Court of Appeals for the Sixth Circuit
Wilbur Kingsbury Miller (BA) Senior Judge of the United States Court of Appeals for the District of Columbia Circuit
Gordon Myse (LAW) Judge of the Wisconsin Court of Appeals
Susan Bieke Neilson (AB) Judge of the United States Court of Appeals for the Sixth Circuit
Stewart Albert Newblatt (LAW)  He was a judge of the Seventh Judicial Circuit of Michigan from 1962 to 1970. 
Elliott Northcott (LAW) Senior Judge of the United States Court of Appeals for the Fourth Circuit
Richard Lowell Nygaard (LAW) Judge of the United States Court of Appeals for the Third Circuit
Darleen Ortega (LAW) Judge on the Oregon Court of Appeals
Orie Leon Phillips (LAW) Senior Judge of the United States Court of Appeals for the Tenth Circuit
Cecil F. Poole (LAW) Senior Judge of the United States Court of Appeals for the Ninth Circuit
Rosemary S. Pooler (LAW) Judge of the United States Court of Appeals for the Second Circuit
Chad Readler (LAW) Senior Judge of the United States Court of Appeals for the Sixth Circuit
Albert L. Rendlen (LAW)Judge Rendlen was a judge on the Missouri Court of Appeals for the Eastern District
Henry Wade Rogers (BA, MA) Judge of the United States Court of Appeals for the Second Circuit
John M. Rogers (LAW) Senior Judge of the United States Court of Appeals for the Sixth Circuit
Gilbert M. Roman (LAW) Judge of the Colorado Court of Appeals
Anthony Joseph Scirica (LAW) Senior Judge of the United States Court of Appeals for the Third Circuit
Susan Segal (LAW) Chief Judge of the Minnesota Court of Appeals
Charles Casper Simons (LAW) Senior Judge of the United States Court of Appeals for the Sixth Circuit
Cynthia Stevens (BA) Judge of the Michigan Court of Appeals for the First District
Deanell Reece Tacha (LAW) Senior Judge of the United States Court of Appeals for the Tenth Circuit
David S. Tatel (LAW) Judge of the United States Court of Appeals for the District of Columbia Circuit
Arba Seymour Van Valkenburgh (AB)  Senior Judge of the United States Court of Appeals for the Eighth Circuit
Melissa L. Tatum (LAW) Tatum served as a member of the Navajo Nation's Rules Harmonization Project, co-authoring a report on Navajo Nation Proceedings and Outside Review. She sat as a judge on the Southwest Intertribal Court of Appeals from 1999 to 2006. 
Kurtis T. Wilder (LAW) In December 1998, Governor Engler elevated Wilder to the Michigan First District Court of Appeals.
Ann Claire Williams (MA) Senior Judge of the United States Court of Appeals for the Seventh Circuit
John M. Walker Jr. (LAW) Senior Judge of the United States Court of Appeals for the Second Circuit
Elizabeth Kronk Warner (LAW) she is an appellate judge in Michigan for the Sault Ste. Marie Tribe of Chippewa Indians Court of Appeals.
J. Walter Yeagley (JD) Senior Judge of the District of Columbia Court of Appeals

Justices: District Courts
As of 2021, 71 Michigan  alumni have served on District Courts. Of those who served, 16 have served as Chief Justice.

Cathy Ann Bencivengo (JD) Judge of the United States District Court for the Southern District of California*Richard Bilby (LAW) Chief Judge of the United States District Court for the District of Arizona
Jane M. Beckering (born 1965)[1] is a judge of the 3rd District of the Michigan Court of Appeals and a United States District Judge–Designate of the United States District Court for the Western District of Michigan.
Paul D. Borman (LAW) Judge of the United States District Court for the Eastern District of Michigan
Clarence Addison Brimmer, Jr. (LAW) Chief Judge of the United States District Court for the District of Wyoming
Leonie Brinkema (MDNG) Judge of the United States District Court for the Eastern District of Virginia
Paul G. Byron (A.B.) Judge of the United States District Court for the Middle District of Florida
Aileen Cannon (LAW) Judge of the United States District Court for the Southern District of Florida
John Emmett Carland (A.B.) Judge of the United States District Court for the District of South Dakota
Edmond Chang (BSE) Judge of the United States District Court for the Northern District of Illinois
Pamela K. Chen (B.A.) Judge of the United States District Court for the Eastern District of New York
James Paul Churchill (LAW) Chief Judge of the United States District Court for the Eastern District of Michigan; Senior Judge of the United States District Court for the Eastern District of Michigan
Chase A. Clark (MDNG) on US District Court for the District of Idaho. He served as Chief Judge from 1954 to 1964. 
Avern Cohn (LAW) Senior Judge of the United States District Court for the Eastern District of Michigan
Sean Cox (B.G.S.) Judge of the United States District Court for the Eastern District of Michigan
John Davies (B.A.) Judge of the United States District Court for the Central District of California
J. Mac Davis (LAW) Chief Judge of the 3rd District of Wisconsin Circuit Courts
William Louis Day (LAW) Judge of the United States District Court for the Northern District of Ohio
Ann Donnelly (B.A.)  Judge of the United States District Court for the Eastern District of New York
Gershwin A. Drain (LAW) Judge of the United States District Court for the Eastern District of Michigan
Cristobal C. Duenas was the chief judge of the United States District Court of Guam from 1959 to 1961.
Gregory Kent Frizzell (LAW) Chief Judge of the United States District Court for the Northern District of Oklahoma
Sarah Geraghty (born 1974)[1] is an American lawyer from Georgia who serves as senior counsel for the Southern Center for Human Rights. She is a nominee to be a United States District Judge of the United States District Court for the Northern District of Georgia.
Mark A. Goldsmith (B.A.) Judge of the United States District Court for the Eastern District of Michigan
Ralph B. Guy Jr. (LAW) Judge of the United States District Court for the Eastern District of Michigan
R. James Harvey (LAW) Senior Judge of the United States District Court for the Eastern District of Michigan
Jeffrey James Helmick (B.A.) Judge of the United States District Court for the Northern District of Ohio
Guy T. Helvering (LAW) Judge of the United States District Court for the District of Kansas
H. Russel Holland (LAW) Senior Judge of the United States District Court for the District of Alaska
Marilyn L. Huff (LAW) Senior Judge of the United States District Court for the Southern District of California
Carol E. Jackson (LAW) Chief Judge of the United States District Court for the Eastern District of Missouri
Hala Y. Jarbou (B.B.A.) Judge of the United States District Court for the Western District of Michigan
Ralph E. Jenney (LAW) Judge of the United States District Court for the Southern District of California
Paul Jones (judge) (LAW) Chief Judge of the United States District Court for the Northern District of Ohio
Robert James Jonker (LAW) Chief Judge of the United States District Court for the Western District of Michigan
Cornelia Groefsema Kennedy (LAW) Chief Judge of the United States District Court for the Eastern District of Michigan
Shalina D. Kumar (born 1971)[1] is an American attorney and jurist from Michigan who is a United States District Judge–Designate of the United States District Court for the Eastern District of Michigan.
Judith Ellen Levy (LAW) Judge of the United States District Court for the Eastern District of Michigan
Sheryl H. Lipman (B.A.) Judge of the United States District Court for the Western District of Tennessee
Joe Billy McDade (LAW) Chief Judge of the United States District Court for the Central District of Illinois
Howard D. McKibben (LAW) Senior Judge of the United States District Court for the District of Nevada
Glenn Everell Mencer (LAW) Senior Judge of the United States District Court for the Western District of Pennsylvania
Laurie J. Michelson (A.B.) Judge of the United States District Court for the Eastern District of Michigan
Frank Montalvo (M.S.) Judge of the United States District Court for the Western District of Texas
James Byron Moran (June 20, 1930 – April 21, 2009) was a United States District Judge of the United States District Court for the Northern District of Illinois.
Stewart Albert Newblatt (LAW) Senior Judge of the United States District Court for the Eastern District of Michigan
John Albert Nordberg (LAW) Senior Judge of the United States District Court for the Northern District of Illinois
Linda Vivienne Parker (BA) Judge of the United States District Court for the Eastern District of Michigan
Rosemary S. Pooler (LAW) Judge of the United States District Court for the Northern District of New York
John William Potter (LAW) Senior Judge of the United States District Court for the Northern District of Ohio
Nicholas Ranjan (LAW) Judge of the United States District Court for the Western District of Pennsylvania
Victoria A. Roberts (B.A.) Senior Judge of the United States District Court for the Eastern District of Michigan
Jennifer L. Rochon is an American lawyer who is a nominee to serve as a judge of the United States District Court for the Southern District of New York. 
Stephen John Roth (LAW) Judge of the United States District Court for the Eastern District of Michigan
Mary M. Rowland (B.A.) Judge of the United States District Court for the Northern District of Illinois
Anthony Joseph Scirica (LAW) Judge of the United States District Court for the Eastern District of Michigan
Shira Scheindlin (B.A.) Senior Judge of the United States District Court for the Southern District of New York
Steven C. Seeger (LAW) Judge of the United States District Court for the Northern District of Illinois
Norma Levy Shapiro (B.A.) Senior Judge of the United States District Court for the Eastern District of Pennsylvania
Charles Casper Simons (LAW) Chief Judge of the United States Court of Appeals for the Sixth Circuit
Raymond Wesley Starr (LAW) Senior Judge of the United States District Court for the Western District of Michigan
George Caram Steeh III (LAW) Senior Judge of the United States District Court for the Eastern District of Michigan
Joseph Edward Stevens Jr. (LAW) Chief Judge of the United States District Court for the Western District of Missouri
William Story (attorney) (A.B.) Judge of the United States District Court for the Western District of Arkansas
Cyrus Nils Tavares (LAW) Senior Judge of the United States District Court for the District of Hawaii
Frank Gordon Theis (LAW) Chief Judge of the United States District Court for the District of Kansas
Nancy Torresen (LAW) Chief Judge of the United States District Court for the District of Maine
Arba Seymour Van Valkenburgh (A.B.) Judge of the United States District Court for the Western District of Missouri
John M. Walker Jr. (LAW) Chief Judge of the United States Court of Appeals for the Second Circuit
Frederick H. Weisberg is a former judge of senior status for the Superior Court of the District of Columbia. 
Ann Claire Williams (M.A.) Judge of the United States District Court for the Northern District of Illinois
Thomas Samuel Zilly (BA) Senior Judge of the United States District Court for the Western District of Washington

National supreme court justices
Irene Cortes (LL.M, S.J.D.), Associate Justice of the Supreme Court of the Philippines 1987–1990; first female dean of the University of the Philippines College of Law
Jaime Sifre Dávila (LAW) (November 24, 1887 – October 6, 1960) was an attorney and judge in Puerto Rico, ultimately serving as an Associate Justice and briefly as the Chief Justice of the Supreme Court of Puerto Rico.
George A. Malcolm (LAW: JD 1906), Associate Justice of the Supreme Court of the Philippines 1917–1936; founder of the University of the Philippines College of Law
David Mills (LAW: LLB 1867), Puisne Justice of the Supreme Court of Canada; served as Minister of the Interior in the Cabinet of Alexander Mackenzie 1876–1878; appointed to the Supreme Court of Canada in 1902 and served for one year until his death in 1903; published The Present and Future Political Aspects of Canada in 1860 and The Blunders of the Dominion Government in Connection with the North-West Territory in 1871
Frank Murphy Associate Justice of the Supreme Court of the United States
Pieter Jacobus Rabie (1917–1997) was a senior South African judge during the apartheid era, and its Chief Justice from 1982 to 1989.
Florenz Regalado was the 14th appointment by President Corazon Aquino to be an associate justice of the Supreme Court of the Philippines from July 29, 1988, to October 13, 1998. He graduated magna cum laude in 1954 from the San Beda College of Law, and received his Master of Laws degree from the University of Michigan in 1963
Maria Lourdes "Meilou" Aranal Sereno) (LLM) (Tagalog: [sɛˈrɛnɔ], born Maria Lourdes Punzalan Aranal; July 2, 1960) is a Filipina lawyer and judge who served as de facto Chief Justice of the Supreme Court of the Philippines from 2012 until 2018.
Justice George Sutherland, United States Supreme Court

State supreme court justices
As of 2019, Michigan has placed onto various State Supreme Courts over 125 graduates, 40 of whom served as Chief Justice.

Michigan Supreme Court justices

Michigan Law School alumni

Michigan law has placed 36 of its graduates on the state's supreme court. Of those who served, 16 served as Chief Justice.

Clark J. Adams (LAW): 1927; On Court: 1952–1953)
Paul L. Adams (LAW: 1936; On Court: 1962–1962 and 1964–1972)
Emerson R. Boyles (LAW): 1903; On Court: 1940–1956)
Henry M. Butzel (LAW: 1892; On Court: 1929–1955) served as Chief Justice in 1939
William Leland Carpenter (LAW: 1878; On Court: 1902–1904)
Leland W. Carr (LAW: 1906; On Court: 1941–1963) served as Chief Justice
John R. Dethmers (LAW: 1927; On Court: 1946–1970), served as Chief Justice
Louis H. Fead (LAW: 1900; On Court: 1928–1937), served as Chief Justice
John W. Fitzgerald (LAW: 1954; On Court: 1974–1982), served as Chief Justice
Richard C. Flannigan (LAW) was an American jurist and lawyer. (served as Chief Justice)
Claudius B. Grant (A.B.) was an American jurist, legislator, and lawyer. (served as Chief Justice)
Robert P. Griffin (LAW: 1950; On Court: 1987–1994)
Frank A. Hooker (LAW: 1865; On Court: 1893–1907) (served as Chief Justice during 3 separate periods.
Franz C. Kuhn (LAW: 1894; On Court: 1912–1919)
Charles Leonard Levin (LAW: 1947; On Court: 1973–1996)
Lawrence B. Lindemer (LAW: 1948; On Court: 1975–1976)
Isaac Marston (LAW: 1861; On Court: 1875–1883) served as Chief Justice
Thomas F. McAllister (LAW: 1921; On Court: 1938–1941)
Aaron Vance McAlvay (LAW: 1869; On Court: 1905–1915)
John Samuel McDonald (LAW: 1891; On Court: 1922–1933)
John W. McGrath (LAW: 1868; On Court: 1891–1895) served as Chief Justice
Blair Moody (LAW: 1952; On Court: 1977–1982)
Joseph B. Moore, studied for 1 year at Michigan Law (On Court: 1896–1926), served as Chief Justice over several periods
Walter Harper North (LAW: 1899; On Court: 1927–1952) served as Chief Justice
Russell C. Ostrander (LAW: 1876; On Court: 1905–1919) served as Chief Justice
William W. Potter (LAW: 1895; On Court: 1928–1940), served as Chief Justice
Edward MacGlen Sharpe (LAW: 1914; On Court: 1934–1957)
Talbot Smith (LAW: 1934; On Court: 1955–1961)
Ernest A. Snow (LAW: 1896; On Court: 1926–1927)
Theodore Souris (LAW: 1949; On Court: 1960–1968)
Joseph H. Steere (LAW) was an American jurist. served as Chief Justice
Raymond Wesley Starr (LAW: 1910; On Court: 1941–1946), Attorney General of Michigan from 1937 to 1938
David Viviano (LAW: 1996; On Court: 2013–present)
John D. Voelker (LAW: 1928; On Court: 1957–1959)
Thomas Addis Emmett Weadock (LAW: 1873; On Court: 1933–1933)
G. Mennen Williams (LAW: 1936; On Court: 1971–1986), served as Chief Justice

Alumni of other Michigan schools
Michigan Supreme Court Justices from other University of Michigan schools:
Richard H. Bernstein (B.A.), lawyer and Michigan Supreme Court justice
Charles A. Blair (B.A.) (1854–1912) was a member of the Michigan Supreme Court from 1905 until 1912.
Megan Cavanagh (B.E.) is an attorney who was elected in November 2018 to become an associate justice of the Michigan Supreme Court with a term beginning in January 2019.
Mary Beth Kelly (BA), justice of the Michigan Supreme Court, elected in November 2010
Charles Leonard Levin (BA, LLB) was a U.S. jurist. He served as a Michigan Court of Appeals judge from 1966 to 1972 and as a justice of the Michigan Supreme Court from 1973 to 1996. He attended the University of Michigan where he received his B.A. in 1946 and his LL.B. in 1947 from the University of Michigan Law School.
Rollin H. Person (LLB) He studied law at University of Michigan Law School and was admitted to the Michigan bar in 1873. Person served as Michigan circuit court judge from 1891 to 1899. Person then served on the Michigan Supreme Court from 1915 to 1917. 
Clifford Taylor (BA), Chief Justice of the Michigan Supreme Court 2005–2009; appointed in 1997 by Republican Gov. John Engler; re-elected in 2000 to serve an eight-year term; in 2004, he was first chosen by the justices to serve as Chief Justice; in 1992, Gov. Engler appointed him to the Michigan Court of Appeals where he served until his appointment to the Michigan Supreme Court; co-author of Michigan Practice Guide on Torts
Kurtis T. Wilder (AB, JD) He attended the University Michigan, graduating in 1981 with a A.B. degree in political science, and earned his Juris Doctor from the University of Michigan Law School in 1984. On May 9, 2017, Governor Snyder appointed Wilder to the Michigan Supreme Court. Wilder will complete his predecessor Robert P. Young Jr.'s term in December 2018.

Illinois Supreme Court justices
Joseph N. Carter (LLB) In 1894, Carter was named a candidate for the Supreme Court of Illinois to fill the vacancy of Simeon P. Shope. He was the youngest member of the court upon his election. He served one term as Chief Justice in 1898–1899.
James H. Cartwright (MDNG) was an American jurist. He went to Mount Morris Seminary and University of Michigan. Cartwright served on the Illinois Supreme Court from 1895 until his death in 1924.
William G. Clark (MDNG) In 1976, Clark was elected to the Illinois Supreme Court and served until 1992. He served as Chief Justice of the Illinois Supreme Court from 1985 to 1988.
Lott R. Herrick (JD) was an American lawyer and jurist. Herrick graduated from the University of Michigan Law School in 1894. From 1933 until his death in 1937, Herrick served on the Illinois Supreme Court.
Loren E. Murphy (LLB) Murphy received his law degree from University of Michigan Law School in 1906. From 1939 to 1948, Murphy served on the Illinois Supreme Court and was chief justice. 
Elwyn Riley Shaw (LLB) was a United States federal judge. Shaw received an LL.B. from the University of Michigan Law School in 1910, and immediately entered private practice in Freeport, Illinois. He was a judge on the Supreme Court of Illinois from 1933 to 1942, serving as Chief Justice from 1938 to 1939.

Indiana Supreme Court justices
Timothy Edward Howard (MDNG) served 2191 days in office on the state of Indiana Supreme Court, preceded by Robert W. McBride succeeded by Francis E. Baker
Isadore Levine (BA, JD) was a Justice of the Supreme Court of Indiana from January 13, 1955, to May 23, 1955. He then received a B.A. from the University of Michigan in 1920, and a J.D. from the University of Michigan Law School in 1921.
Clarence R. Martin served on Indiana Supreme Court for 2192, proceeded by Louis B. Ewbank, succeeded by James P. Hughes
Myra C. Selby (JD) In 1995, she was appointed to the Indiana Supreme Court, where she served as both the first African American and first woman appointed to the highest state court in Indiana.
Oliver Starr (LLB) was a Justice of the Supreme Court of Indiana from January 1, 1945, to January 1, 1951. Starr received an A.B. from Indiana University in 1905, and an LL.B. from the University of Michigan Law School in 1908.
Allen Zollars (LLB) was a politician and judge in Indiana who served as a Justice of the Supreme Court of Indiana from January 1, 1883, to January 7, 1889.

Ohio Supreme Court justices
Herbert R. Brown (JD) is a lawyer and author from the U.S. State of Ohio who sat on the Ohio Supreme Court for six years, then devoted his time to writing fiction.
Robert H. Day He attended the University of Michigan for two years and graduated from the Cincinnati Law School in 1891. On November 9, 1922, Robert Day was elected to the Ohio Supreme Court, and was seated January 1, 1923. He was re-elected in November 1928 for another 6-year term. He served until his death in Columbus, Ohio September 29, 1933. 
Richard Patrick "Pat" DeWine is an American lawyer and an associate justice of the Ohio Supreme Court.
William C. Dixon was an American government antitrust lawyer who had a two-month term as a Justice of the Ohio Supreme Court in 1938.
David Dudley Dowd Jr. (JD) received a Juris Doctor from the University of Michigan Law School in 1954. He was a Justice of the Ohio Supreme Court from 1980 to 1981. He was in private practice in Canton, Ohio from 1981 to 1982
William L. Hart (LLB) was a lawyer in the U.S. State of Ohio who served as a justice of the Supreme Court of Ohio. He taught law at university, and was president of the Ohio State Bar Association.
Paul M. Herbert (BA) served as a justice of the Ohio Supreme Court from 1963 to 1969. 
John Allen Shauck (LLB) was a Republican politician in the U.S. State of Ohio who was an Ohio Supreme Court Judge 1895–1914.
Roy Hughes Williams (JD) was a lawyer from the U.S. State of Ohio who served as a prosecutor, local and appellate judge, and was a justice of the Supreme Court of Ohio from 1934 until his death.

Other state supreme courts
Kazuhisa Abe (LAW) (January 18, 1914 – May 18, 1996)was a Democratic state senator and Justice of the Supreme Court of Hawaii.
Francis E. Baker (B.A.) (October 20, 1860 – March 15, 1924) was a United States federal judge. Born in Goshen, Indiana, Baker received a B.A. from the University of Michigan in 1882 and read law to enter the Bar in 1884.
William H. Barnes (LLB) served as Assistant Justice on the Arizona Territorial Supreme Court from 1885 till 1889.
Charles C. Black (LLB) was an associate justice of the New Jersey Supreme Court and was the Democratic nominee for Governor of New Jersey in 1904.  He received a law degree from University of Michigan Law School in 1881.
Charles Blakey Blackmar (J.D.), judge of the Supreme Court of Missouri 1982–1992; chief justice of the court 1989–1991
Dario Borghesan is an American lawyer from Alaska who is an associate justice of the Alaska Supreme Court.
Charles D. Breitel (B.A.) In 1950, Dewey appointed him a justice of the New York Supreme Court to fill the vacancy caused by the death of Samuel Null. In December 1950, Dewey re-appointed Breitel to the Supreme Court to fill the vacancy caused by the resignation of Ferdinand Pecora. In November 1951, he was elected on the Republican and Democratic tickets to a 14-year term, and re-elected in 1965.
Alfred Budge sat on the Idaho Supreme Court from 1914 to 1949. Serving at one time as the Chief Justice
Rousseau Angelus Burch was an associate justice of the Kansas Supreme Court from September 29, 1902, to July 1, 1935, then Chief Justice of the Kansas Supreme Court July 1, 1935 to January 11, 1937.
Stephen Bushong (LAW), a judge on the Multnomah County Circuit Court of Oregon since 2008, will fill the Supreme Court vacancy in 2023.
Charles C. Butler Justice and Chief Justice of the Colorado Supreme Court
John Emmett Carland was a United States federal judge. Carland attended the University of Michigan, and read law in 1877 to enter the Bar. He was the U.S. Attorney for the Dakota Territory from 1885 to 1888, and a Justice of the Dakota territorial Supreme Court in 1888 and 1889. 
Margaret Chutich (JD) is an American lawyer and judge, who has served as an associate justice of the Minnesota Supreme Court since 2016, when she was appointed by Governor Mark Dayton.
Robert N. Clinton is an American constitutional lawyer, and law professor at the Arizona State University Sandra Day O'Connor College of Law, who sits on numerous native-American tribal appellate courts. In addition to teaching, he sits as Chief Justice of the Winnebago Supreme Court.
Nathaniel P. Conrey (LLB) was an associate justice of the Supreme Court of California from October 1, 1935, to November 2, 1936. His 36 years on the bench place him among the longest serving judges in California history.
Jesse W. Curtis Sr. (LLB) was an American attorney who served as an associate justice of the Supreme Court of California from January 1, 1926, to January 1, 1945.
Jaime Sifre Dávila (JD) was an attorney and judge in Puerto Rico, ultimately serving as an Associate Justice and briefly as the Chief Justice of the Supreme Court of Puerto Rico.
James R. Dean (LLB) was a Justice of the Nebraska Supreme Court from 1909 to 1910, and again from 1917 to 1935.
Wallace B. Douglas (J.D.) (September 21, 1852 – December 9, 1930) was a lawyer, jurist, and politician and Justice of Minnesota's Supreme Court.
James B. Drew (MDNG) was a Chief Justice of the Supreme Court of Pennsylvania.
Rebecca Duncan (JD) is an American lawyer and judge, who has been an associate justice of the Oregon Supreme Court since 2017. She previously served on the Oregon Court of Appeals from 2010 to 2017.
John P. Elkin (JD 1884) Associate Justice of the Supreme court of Pennsylvania
Victor A. Elliott Victor Alanson Elliott (July 23, 1839 – February 5, 1899) was an associate justice of the Colorado Supreme Court from 1888 to 1895.
Franz C. Eschweiler (MDNG) was an American jurist from Wisconsin. Eschweiler studied at the University of Michigan and the University of Iowa. In 1910, he was appointed a Wisconsin Circuit Court judge for Milwaukee County, Wisconsin. Eschweiler was appointed to the Wisconsin Supreme Court, in 1916, serving until his death in 1929.
Robert E. Evans (JD) He graduated from the law department of the University of Michigan at Ann Arbor, Michigan in 1886 and was admitted to the bar. He was elected Judge of the Supreme Court from the Third District of Nebraska in 1924. He served until his death on July 8, 1925. 
Bayard T. Hainer (1860–1933) was a Justice of the Territorial Oklahoma Supreme Court in 1898.
Lawrence T. Harris (LLB) was an American politician and lawyer in the state of Oregon. He was the 45th Associate Justice of the Oregon Supreme Court, serving from 1914 to 1924.
Seneca Haselton (LLB) was a Vermont educator, attorney and politician. He is notable for his service as mayor of Burlington, Vermont (1891-1894), U.S. Minister to Venezuela (1894-1895), and an associate justice of the Vermont Supreme Court (1902–1906, 1908–1919).
Albert H. Horton (March 12, 1837 – September 2, 1902) was Chief Justice of the Kansas Supreme Court from December 31, 1876, to April 30, 1895.
Gilbert V. Indeglia (JD) is a justice of the Rhode Island Supreme Court. Indeglia is a 1959 graduate of Providence's Classical High School, a 1963 graduate of Boston College, and a 1966 graduate of the University of Michigan Law School.
Orange Jacobs (MDNG) was an American lawyer, newspaper publisher, and politician. His career in government centered on the Territory of Washington, for which he served as a delegate to the U.S. Congress, chief justice of the territory's supreme court, mayor of Seattle, and other roles.
William D. Keeton served on the Idaho Supreme Court from 1949 until 1959. Serving, for part of his tenure, as the Chief Justice
Glenn E. Kelley was a Justice of the Minnesota Supreme Court from 1981 to 1990.
La Vega G. Kinne (November 5, 1846 – March 15, 1906) was a Justice of the Iowa Supreme Court from January 1, 1892, to December 31, 1897, appointed from Tama County.
William H. King (JD) After holding local offices and serving two terms in the territorial legislature, he graduated from the law department of the University of Michigan at Ann Arbor. He later joined the Utah bar and practiced law. He held other territorial offices and was appointed as an associate justice of the Utah Supreme Court, serving between 1894 and 1896.
Steven Levinson (JD)  an associate justice of the Hawaii State Supreme Court, Levinson served his first term from 1992 to 2002 and was retained by the Judicial Selection Commission to serve a second ten-year term. He retired from the court, effective December 31, 2008.
Peter J. Maassen (JD) is a justice of the Alaska Supreme Court, who was appointed in 2012; appointed to position of Chief Justice in 2022 with a term commencing in 2023.
John A. Matthews was a Justice of the Montana Supreme Court from 1919 to 1920, and again from 1925 to 1937.
George W. Maxey (BA) was a Justice of the Supreme Court of Pennsylvania from 1930 to 1943 and Chief Justice from 1943 to 1950.
Abner Vernon McCall (LLM) In 1943, he received an LL.M from the University of Michigan. He was appointed a Texas Supreme Court Justice in June 1956 by Governor Allan Shivers. He was also a past President of the Baptist General Convention of Texas.
David A. Nichols was a Justice of the Maine Supreme Judicial Court from May 24, 1977, to May 31, 1988.
Frank W. Parker (LLB)  was an American judge who served on the New Mexico Supreme Court for 35 years, from its territorial period to after statehood. He earned a Bachelor of Laws from the University of Michigan Law School in 1880. Parker was appointed to serve on the Territorial Supreme Court on January 10, 1898, by President William McKinley, on the recommendation of territorial governor Miguel Antonio Otero. He was reappointed to the Territorial Supreme Court by President Theodore Roosevelt in 1901 and 1905, and by William Howard Taft in 1909. While serving as a territorial district court judge
Vernon Robert Pearson Governor John Spellman appointed Pearson as an associate justice of the Washington Supreme Court. He served as an associate justice from 1982 to 1987, having been named Acting Chief Justice in 1985, and then chief justice from 1987 to 1989.
Charles N. Potter (LLB) was a Justice of the Wyoming Supreme Court from January 7, 1895, to December 20, 1927.
Albert L. Rendlen (MDNG) was judge on the Supreme Court of Missouri from 1977 until 1992, and the Chief Justice of that Court from January 1982 until June 1985.
John Campbell Rice (January 27, 1864 – November 7, 1937) was an associate justice of the Idaho Supreme Court who served as chief justice of the court from 1922 to 1923.
John E. Richards (LLB) was an American attorney who served as an associate justice of the California Supreme Court from 1924 until 1932.
John Sherman Robinson (B.A. 1903) (December 17, 1880 – October 9, 1951) was an American track and field athlete, lawyer, judge, and Chief Justice of the Washington Supreme Court. 
Marvin B. Rosenberry (JD) was an American jurist from Wisconsin. He received his law degree from the University of Michigan Law School. In 1916, he was appointed to the Wisconsin Supreme Court and, in 1929, Rosenberry became chief justice of the supreme court serving until his retirement in 1950.
John W. Shenk (LLB) was a city attorney in Los Angeles, California, a Superior Court judge and a member of the California Supreme Court.
Joseph J. Simeone (SJD) was judge on the Supreme Court of Missouri from 1978 until 1979.
William Redwood Smith was an associate justice of the Kansas Supreme Court from January 9, 1899, to July 1, 1905. 
Martha B. Sosman served as an associate justice of the Massachusetts Supreme Judicial Court from 2000 until her death.
William Story (B.A.) was a United States federal judge and later the seventh Lieutenant Governor of Colorado, serving from 1891 to 1893 under John Long Routt. He was a judge of the Second Judicial Circuit Court of Arkansas from 1867 to 1871, sitting as a "special Chief Justice" on the Arkansas Supreme Court in 1869.
John Charles Tarsney (LLB) was appointed by U.S. President Grover Cleveland to serve as associate justice of the Supreme Court of Oklahoma Territory in 1896 and served until 1899. 
Samuel R. Thurman (LLB) was a Justice of the Utah Supreme Court from 1917 to 1929, serving as Chief Justice from 1927 to 1929.
Walter L. Tooze (JD) was an American attorney and politician in Oregon. He served as the 66th Associate Justice of the Oregon Supreme Court and as a state district court judge. 
Julius Travis served 4383 days preceded by Moses B. Lairy and succeeded by Michael L. Fansler
Alfred Wallin (JD) was an American judge who served one of the first three Justices of the Supreme Court of North Dakota from 1889 to 1902.
Martha Lee Walters (BA) is an American labor attorney and the 43rd Chief Justice of the Oregon Supreme Court.
J. Stanley Webster (LLB) was a congressman from Eastern Washington, a professor of law at Gonzaga University School of Law, a Washington State Supreme Court justice, and a federal judge
N. D. Wernette sat on the Idaho Supreme Court from 1933 to 1935

Attorneys General
As of 2021, 40 Michigan alumni have served as a state's Attorney General

Paul L. Adams, member of the Michigan Supreme Court in 1962 and 1964–1972; mayor of Sault Ste. Marie 1938–1942; Attorney General of Michigan in 1957; member of the Michigan Supreme Court in 1962
Eugene F. Black (1903–1990), elected Michigan Attorney General as a Republican in 1945
Charles A. Blair (1854–1912), member of the Michigan Supreme Court from 1905 until 1912; held several public offices including prosecuting attorney for Jackson County; elected Attorney General of Michigan in 1902
Steven G. Bradbury, Acting Assistant Attorney General of the United States for the Office of Legal Counsel, 2005–2009
Clarence Addison Brimmer, Jr., state attorney general of Wyoming 1971–1974
Wilber Marion Brucker, assistant attorney general of Michigan, 1927–1928; Michigan Attorney General, 1928–1930
Warren Booth Burrows, member of the Connecticut House of Representatives 1925–1927, member of Connecticut Senate 1927–1928; state attorney general of Connecticut 1931–1935
Charles Burson, served almost a decade as Tennessee Attorney General; became Gore's chief of staff in 1999
Pamela Carter, first black woman to serve as a state's attorney general
Mike Cox, Michigan's 52nd attorney general
Marc Dann, Attorney General of Ohio from 2007 until his resignation in 2008
Harry M. Daugherty (LAW), Attorney General of the United States under Presidents Harding and Coolidge
Ulysses G. Denman, Republican politician from Ohio; Ohio Attorney General 1908–1911
John R. Dethmers, chairman of the Michigan Republican Party 1942–1945; delegate to the 1944 Republican National Convention; Michigan Attorney General 1945–1946
Tyrone C. Fahner, lawyer; received his bachelor's degree from U-M; Illinois Attorney General 1980–1983
Charles E. Gibson Jr., Vermont Attorney General
Horace Weldon Gilmore, member of the Michigan Board of Tax Appeals in 1954; deputy state attorney general of Michigan 1954–1956; judge on the 3rd Judicial Circuit of Detroit 1956–1980
Alexander J. Groesbeck, attorney general; 30th Governor of Michigan
Shiro Kashiwa, first attorney general of Hawaii to be appointed after it became a state in 1959
Franz C. Kuhn, probate judge; Michigan Attorney General in 1910
Cary D. Landis, 25th Florida Attorney General, (1931–1938)
George A. Malcolm, acting attorney-general for the Philippines as of 1911
Dwight May, Michigan Attorney General; served from 1869 to 1873 under Governor Henry P. Baldwin
Frank Millard, Michigan Attorney General, 1951–1954
William J. Morgan, Wisconsin Attorney General 1912–1923, Republican
Dana Nessel, Michigan's 54th attorney general, is an American lawyer and politician from the state of Michigan. She is the first openly LGBTQ person elected to statewide office in Michigan.
William W. Potter, Michigan Attorney General 1927–1928
Charles Byron Renfrew, nominated by President Richard Nixon to the United States District Court for the Northern District of California; confirmed by the United States Senate on December 2, 1971, and received his commission on December 9; served until 1980, when he resigned to become United States Deputy Attorney General, serving in that post until 1981
John W. Reynolds, Sr., Attorney General of Wisconsin 1927–1933; Republican
Stephen John Roth, Attorney General of Michigan 1949–1950
Kenneth Salazar; U.S. Senator; Attorney General of Colorado 1999–2005
John M. Sheets, Republican politician; Ohio Attorney General 1900–1904
Winfield Smith, Attorney General of Wisconsin 1862–1866; Republican
Robert Stafford, deputy attorney general of Vermont 1953–1955; attorney general 1955–1957
Raymond Wesley Starr, Attorney General of Michigan 1937–1938
James M. Swift, lawyer; District Attorney of Massachusetts Southern District; Attorney General of Massachusetts
Cyrus Nils Tavares, deputy attorney general of Hawaii 1927–1934 before returning to private practice in Honolulu, 1934–1941; during World War II he was the special deputy attorney general of Hawaii for war matters, 1941–1942; the assistant attorney general of Hawaii, 1942–1943; and the Attorney General of Hawaii, 1944–1947
Larry Thompson, lawyer; deputy Attorney General of the US under President George W. Bush until 2003
Paul W. Voorhies, Michigan lawyer; Wayne County Prosecutor; Michigan Attorney General
Robert Wefald; 26th North Dakota Attorney General 1981–1984

Presidents or prime ministers
Edgardo Javier Angara (LAW: LLM) (September 24, 1934 – May 13, 2018) was a Filipino politician who served as the President of the Senate of the Philippines from 1993 to 1995. He was a Senator from 1987 to 1998 and then served as Secretary of Agriculture from 1999 to 2001. He served in the Senate again from 2001 to 2013.
Arif Alvi, (Masters in prosthodontics, 1975), President of Pakistan
Abdullah Ensour, (M.A.) former Prime Minister of Jordan
Lester Bird (LLB 1959), Prime Minister of Antigua and Barbuda 1994–2004
Alfonso Bustamante, Peruvian businessman and politician; Prime Minister of Peru 1993–1994
Lamberto Dini, former Prime Minister of Italy
Simeon Djankov (Simeon Dyankov; Deputy Prime Minister and Minister of Finance of Bulgaria in the government of Boyko Borisov
Kim Dong-yeon (Korean: 김동연; born 28 January 1957) is the Minister of Strategy and Finance and a Deputy Prime Minister of South Korea, appointed by President Moon Jae-in in June 2017.
Gerald R. Ford (B. A. 1935, HLLD 1974), 38th U.S. president; studied economics and political science; played center on Michigan's football team; MVP in 1934
Pratap Singh Kairon (MA Political Science), Indian independence leader; former Chief Minister of Punjab 1952–1964
Luis Guillermo Solís Rivera (born 25 April 1958) is a Costa Rican politician who was the 47th President of Costa Rica from 2014 to 2018. Studied for 2 years at Michigan as a Fulbright scholar.
His Highness Sheikh Saud Bin Saqr al Qasimi (LS&A: BA, MA), appointed Supreme Council member and new Ruler of Ras al-Khaimah in the United Arab Emirates on October 27, 2010
Henry Tang Ying-yen, Hong Kong politician; Chief Secretary of Hong Kong 2007–2011

Military

Admirals
Anderson W. Atkinson was a Major General in the United States Air Force.
Rear Adm. Mike Bernacchi grew up in Pleasant Ridge, Michigan, and graduated from the University of Detroit with a Bachelor of Science in Biology and holds master's degrees from University of Michigan in nuclear engineering and industrial engineering.
Benjamin N. Bellis is a retired American Air Force lieutenant general who was vice commander in chief, U.S. Air Forces in Europe,
William Clarence Braisted was an American surgeon. He graduated from the University of Michigan in 1883.
Erroll M. Brown, retired rear admiral in the US Coast Guard; first African-American promoted to flag rank in the Coast Guard
Arleigh Burke (COE: MSE), United States Navy admiral; World War II hero; Chief of Naval Operations (1955–1961)
James B. Currie was a major general in the United States Air Force.
James E. Dalton is a former General and former Chief of Staff of the Supreme Headquarters Allied Powers Europe.
Terrance T. Etnyre (BA 1970), US Navy vice admiral; Commander, Naval Surface Forces
Elon Farnsworth (1858), Union Army brigadier general during the American Civil War; cavalry commander; killed at Gettysburg
Charles D. Griffin, four-star admiral in the US Navy; commander in chief of US Naval Forces Europe 1963–1965; commander in chief of Allied Forces Southern Europe 1965–1968
Arthur E. Henn, retired vice admiral in the US Coast Guard; Vice Commandant 1994–1996
James W. Houck, retired US Navy vice admiral; 41st Judge Advocate General of the US Navy 2009–2012
Ali S. Khan, (University of Michigan Health System residency in internal medicine and pediatrics); Rear admiral in the United States Public Health Service Commissioned Corps; director of the Centers for Disease Control and Prevention
Robert E. Kramek, retired US Coast Guard admiral; 20th Commandant of the US Coast Guard 1994–1998
Robert T. Marsh was a retired United States Air Force four-star general who served as Commander, Air Force Systems Command (COMAFSC) from 1981 to 1984.
Thomas P. Meek, US Navy officer; rear admiral; commander of the Navy Cyber Forces since 2010
Ronald J. Rábago, US Coast Guard Rear Admiral, in 2006 became the first Hispanic American to be promoted to flag rank
Miguel Ángel Barberena Vega, Rear Admiral
John H. Sides was a four-star admiral in the United States Navy who served as commander in chief of the United States Pacific Fleet from 1960 to 1963 and was known as the father of the Navy's guided-missile program.
Willard J. Smith In 1973 he became admiral of the Great Lakes Maritime Academy in Traverse City, Michigan and held
Miguel Ángel Barberena Vega On September 20, 1984, he was promoted to the rank of Rear Admiral by President de la Madrid. He was positioned by the Institutional Revolutionary
James A. Watson, US Coast Guard Rear Admiral
Donald C. Winter, Secretary of the Navy

Generals
Gladeon M. Barnes was a United States Army major general who, as Chief of Research and Engineering in the Ordnance Department, was responsible for the development of 1,600 different weapons.
Dwight E. Beach (MDNG) (July 20, 1908 – July 22, 2000) commanded the United States Forces Korea from 1965 to 1966 and U.S. Army, Pacific from September 1966 to July 1968. 
John Biddle (MDNG), a career US Army officer; Major General; superintendent of the United States Military Academy
Henry Patrick Birmingham was a surgeon and an American brigadier general active during World War I.
Peter J. Boylan (MS 1970) – United States Army major general; President of Georgia Military College
Margaret A. Brewer (BA 1952) – United States Marine Corps brigadier general, Director of Women Marines (1973–1977); first woman to be promoted to a general officer rank in the Marine Corps
Wilber Marion Brucker (BA 1916), Secretary of the Army under President Eisenhower
James B. Currie (1958), United States Air Force major general
Henry L. Evans (M.S.) was a major general in the United States Air Force
Elon J. Farnsworth (July 30, 1837 – July 3, 1863) was a Union Army cavalry general in the American Civil War, killed at the Battle of Gettysburg. Expelled before graduation.
Alfred B. Fitt, lawyer; General Counsel of the Army 1964–1967
Roy K. Flint was a Brigadier General in the United States Army, Dean of the Academic Board at the United States Military Academy, and a president of the Society for Military History.
Lawrence J. Fuller was an American army major general who served as the deputy director of the Defense Intelligence Agency.
Henry James Hatch (April 28, 1869 – December 31, 1931) was a United States Army officer in the late 19th and early 20th centuries. He served in World War I and received the Distinguished Service Medal among other awards.
Charles H. Jacoby Jr. (MA), US Army General; fifth Commander, US Northern Command; 22nd Commander, North American Aerospace Defense Command
Paul J. Kern (master's degrees in mechanical and civil engineering 1973), former US Army general; Commanding General of the United States Army Materiel Command 2001–2004
Theodore C. Lyster, M.D. (10 July 1875, Kansas – 5 August 1933, California) was a United States Army physician and aviation medicine pioneer.
Orrin L. Mann was an American soldier and politician who served as an officer in the Union Army during the American Civil War. 
William James Mayo, M.D., FACS, physician and surgeon; one of the seven founders of the Mayo Clinic; promoted to brigadier general, 1918
Frank Millard (LAW: 1916), appointed by President Eisenhower as the General Counsel of the U.S. Army in 1955
William M. Morrow, enlisted in the US Army in 1888; served for more than 40 years until his retirement in 1930; decorated for his service in World War I; Brigadier General
Jasper Packard was a U.S. Representative from Indiana and brevetted brigadier general.
David G. Perkins (C.O.E. MSME), US Army Lieutenant General; Commander of the United States Army Combined Arms Center at Fort Leavenworth, Kansas
Samuel C. Phillips  was a United States Air Force four-star general who served as Director of NASA's Apollo Program from 1964 to 1969
Benjamin D. Pritchard (LAW: JD 1860), Civil War general who captured Jefferson Davis; served two terms of office as State Treasurer of Michigan 1880–1884; organized the First National Bank of Allegan in 1870 and served as its president until 1905; founded the First State Bank, which was the first bank in the county to be designated as a state depository, the first savings bank, and the first bank to install safety deposit boxes
Eric B. Schoomaker (COM: MD, Ph.D.), 42nd Surgeon General of the US Army; Commanding General, US Army Medical Command; practicing hematologist
Robert L. Van Antwerp, Jr. (M.S. mechanical engineering), US Army lieutenant general; Chief of Engineers of the United States Army Corps of Engineers 2007–2011

Foreign officials
Miguel Hernandez Agosto (Ph.D.) 9th President of the Senate of Puerto Rico; President pro tempore of the Senate of Puerto Rico
Víctor Bravo Ahuja, Mexican politician; academician; Secretary of Public Education in the administration of Luis Echeverría (1970–76); Governor of Oaxaca
Estefania Aldaba-Lim (Ph.D.), first female Filipino Cabinet secretary; social services and development secretary 1971–1977; first Filipino clinical psychologist; President of the Girl Scouts of the Philippines; first woman to become special ambassador to the United Nations (1979); UN Peace Medal Award
Arif Alvi, the 13th and current President of Pakistan, founding member of the Pakistan Tehreek-e-Insaf, the Secretary-General of the party from 2006 to 2013, and former dentist.
Diego Enrique Arria Salicetti, Governor of the Federal District of Caracas in the mid-1970s
Chulanope Snidvongs na Ayuthaya (COE: MSE), Privy Councillor to the King of Thailand
José E. Benedicto was the Treasurer of Puerto Rico, and briefly served as acting Governor of Puerto Rico in 1921.
Luis María Ramírez Boettner (March 13, 1918 – July 25, 2017) was a Paraguayan diplomat and lawyer who served as the Minister of Foreign Affairs of Paraguay from December 16, 1993, until May 9, 1996.
Emilio Cárdenas (LAW: LLM 1966), served in a variety of capacities at the United Nations 1992–1996; Argentina's Permanent Representative to the United Nations; Argentina's Ambassador to Dominica and Guyana; non-permanent member of the United Nations Security Council for two years (1994–1995)
Santiago Creel Miranda, Mexican senator representing the right-of-center National Action Party; Secretary of the Interior in the cabinet of President Vicente Fox, President of the Senate of Mexico
Terry Davis (M.B.A. 1962), longtime Labour member of the British House of Commons (1971–2004); Secretary General of the Council of Europe (2004–2009); member of the Privy Council
Simeon Djankov (Simeon Dyankov (Ph.D. 1997), Bulgarian economist; Deputy Prime Minister and Minister of Finance of Bulgaria in the government of Boyko Borisov
Piet Hein Donner, Dutch politician of the Christian Democratic Appeal; Minister of the Interior and Kingdom Relations (2010–2012); Minister of Social Affairs and Employment (2007–2010); Minister of Justice (2002–2006)
Gerardo Ruiz Esparza (LAW), was a Mexican attorney and politician who served as the Secretary of Communications and Transportation in the cabinet of Enrique Peña Nieto.
Howard Flight (MBA), life peer and Conservative member of the House of Lords (2010–present); former member of the British House of Commons (1997–2005); wealthy entrepreneur and investor
Julio Frenk (SPH: M.P.H. 1981; MA 1982; Ph.D. 1983), Minister of Health for Mexico
Kamal Ganzouri, appointed as Governor of the New Valley State in 1976; Governor of the Bani Suef State in 1977 but resigned after just six months
 Jaime Sanín Greiffenstein (LLM 1957), Justice of the Supreme Court (1987–1991) and Constitutional Court (1991–1993) of Colombia
Henry Ho (Ph.D.), named Minister of Finance, Taiwan, in 2006
José Miguel Insulza Salinas, Chilean politician; statesman; since 2005 the Secretary General of the Organization of American States
William Ansel Kinney In 1887 he was elected to the legislature of the Hawaiian Kingdom as a representative from Hawaiʻi island.[7] During the summer of 1887, he helped draft the 1887 Constitution of the Kingdom of Hawaii, called the "Bayonet Constitution" because King Kalākaua was forced to sign it. 
Okazaki Kunisuke Okazaki Kunisuke (岡崎邦輔, April 12, 1854 – July 22, 1936) was a politician and cabinet minister in the late Meiji and Taishō period Empire of Japan.
Catalino Macaraig Jr. (L.L.B.) was a Filipino political who was the longest-serving (from September 17, 1987, to December 14, 1990) Executive Secretary of President Corazon C. Aquino.
Mark Malloch Brown Minister of State for Africa, Asia and the United Nations; 2nd Deputy Secretary-General of the United Nations
David Mills (Canadian politician) (LAW) Member of the Canadian Parliament for Bothwell, Puisne Justice of the Supreme Court of Canada
Lafayette Morgan (M.Sc.) President William R. Tolbert, Jr., made him a member of the Cabinet, naming him Liberia's first Minister of State without portfolio.
Carlos Rodado Noriega, Ambassador of Colombia to Argentina; Ambassador of Colombia to Spain; President of Ecopetrol; member of the Chamber of Representatives of Colombia; 58th Governor of Atlántico
Roberto de Ocampo (MBA) He was chairman and CEO of the Development Bank of the Philippines in 1989. From 1992 to 98, he served as Secretary of Finance under President Fidel V. Ramos.
Marwan Qasem (or Qassem), Jordanian government official; Foreign Minister in the 1980s; Chief of the Royal Court; aide to King Hussein
Paul Robertson (doctorate), Jamaican politician; has held several government posts, including Minister of Public Service, Minister of Industry and Investment, Minister of Industry and Commerce, Minister of Foreign Affairs, and Minister of Development
Harry Roque Herminio "Harry" Lopez Roque Jr. (Tagalog: [ˈrɔkɛ]; born October 21, 1966) is a Filipino lawyer, politician, and former law professor serving as the presidential spokesperson of President Rodrigo Duterte
Ricardo Rosselló (American Spanish: [roseˈʝo]; born March 7, 1979) is a Puerto Rican politician, scientist, and businessman who served as the governor of Puerto Rico from 2017 to 2019. 
Miriam Defensor Santiago (LL.M. 1975, LL.D. 1976), lawyer; judge; politician; elected judge of the International Criminal Court 2012; Senator of the Philippines (1995–2001 and 2004–2010); ran for President of the Philippines in 1992
Keith Spicer, first Commissioner of Official Languages of Canada, 1970–1977
Khaled Toukan (M.Sc. nuclear engineering 1978), minister of education, Jordan
Stephen A. Tolbert (B.S., M.S. in forestry), secretary of agriculture and commerce and minister of finance, Liberia
Amnuay Viravan (BUS: MBA 1954, Ph.D. 1958), deputy prime minister and minister of finance, Thailand; chairman of the board of Thai Tobacco Monopoly, State Lottery Bureau, Government Saving Bank, Krung Thai Bank, Bank for Agriculture
Maxwell Freeman Yalden (M.A. Ph.D.), Canada's ambassador to Belgium and Luxembourg 1984–1987
Lawrence Wong (M.A. economics 1995), Singaporean politician who is a Member of Parliament of the Parliament of Singapore (2011–present); Minister for Culture, Community and Youth (2012–2015); Minister for National Development (2015–2020); Second Minister of Finance (2016–present); Minister for Education (2020–present).
Wang Zhengting (LAW) Premier of the Republic of China Acting

Secretaries of the Cabinet
As of 2020, Michigan matriculants have served in 42 Cabinet positions.

Clinton Presba Anderson (1915–1916), Congressional Representative; Senator from New Mexico; Secretary of Agriculture
Edgardo Angara (LAW: LLM 1964), Secretary of Agriculture (emeritus) of the Philippines; former Executive Secretary
Dr. José Celso Barbosa Alcala was a Puerto Rican physician, sociologist and political leader. Known as the father of the Statehood for Puerto Rico movement
Rand Beers (MA 1970); had a public service career spanning 25 years; took over terrorism and narcotics desk at the National Security Council following Oliver North; appointed by President Clinton in 1998 to Assistant Secretary of State for International Narcotic and Law Enforcement Affairs; assigned to counter-terrorism in the George W. Bush White House; foreign policy advisor to John Kerry campaign
Grace Bochenek Bochenek served as the acting United States Secretary of Energy in early 2017.
Steven G. Bradbury (JD) Acting United States Secretary of Transportation
Bill Brehm (A.B., M.A.), assistant secretary of the army under Presidents Johnson and Nixon; assistant secretary of defense under Presidents Nixon and Ford; Chairman (emeritus) of SRA International
Douglas A. Brook (B.A., M.A.), nominated in 2007 as Assistant Secretary of the Navy; Professor of Public Policy and Director of the Center for Defense Management Reform in the School of Business and Public Policy at the Naval Postgraduate School; former Dean of the School of Business and Public Policy at the Naval Postgraduate School; former acting director of the U.S. Office of Personnel Management and Assistant Secretary of the Army (Financial Management)
Wilber Marion Brucker (A.B. 1916), Secretary of the Army
Philip W. Buchen (LAW) (February 27, 1916 – May 21, 2001) was an American attorney who served as White House Counsel during the Ford Administration. He served as chief White House Counsel with Cabinet rank for the duration of Ford's presidency.
Ben Carson Benjamin Solomon "Ben" Carson Sr. (born September 18, 1951) is an American neurosurgeon, author, and politician who is the 17th and current United States Secretary of Housing and Urban Development, under the Trump Administration.
Roy D. Chapin, Sr. (MDNG), US Secretary of Commerce, 1932–33; Hudson Motors President and CEO (1934–36); US Secretary of Commerce (1932–33); Hudson Motors President and CEO (1909–23); Hudson Motors co-founder (1906–09); Member of the Board of Hudson Motors (as Chairman 1923–36)
Terry Davis (BUS: MBA 1962), member of Britain's Parliament for 28 years; Secretary General of the Council of Europe; human rights activist
William Rufus Day, United States Secretary of State during the Mckinley administration; negotiated the peace treaty ending the Spanish–American War; appointed as an Associate Justice of the United States Supreme Court by President Roosevelt
Edwin C. Denby (LAW: JD 1896), Congressional Representative from Michigan; employed in the Chinese imperial maritime customs service 1887–1894; member of the State House of Representatives in 1903; elected as a Republican to the Fifty-ninth, Sixtieth, and Sixty-first Congresses (1905–1911); president of the Detroit Charter Commission in 1913 and 1914; president of the Detroit Board of Commerce in 1916 and 1917; appointed United States Secretary of the Navy by President Harding and served 1921–1924
Robert F. Ellsworth (LAW: JD 1949), Congressional Representative from Kansas; assistant to vice chairman, Federal Maritime Board in 1953 and 1954; elected as a Republican to the Eighty-seventh and to the two succeeding Congresses (1961–1967); National Political Director of the Presidential Campaign in 1968; special assistant to President Nixon, 1969; Permanent Representative on the Council of the North Atlantic Treaty Organization, with rank of Ambassador, 1969–1971; general partner in Lazard Freres and Co. of New York City; Assistant Secretary of Defense (International Security Affairs), 1974–1975; nominated by President Ford to be Deputy Secretary of Defense and served in that capacity 1975–1977; vice chairman of the council, 1977–1990, chairman, 1990–1996, vice president, 1996 to present, International Institute for Strategic Studies, London, England; appointed to the U.S.-China Economic Security Review Commission, 2003–present
Howard Flight (BUS: MBA), British MP; holds 11 directorships; appointed Shadow Paymaster General in 2001; in 2002 was promoted to Shadow Chief Secretary to the Treasury
Dan Glickman (BA History 1966), Congressional Representative from Kansas; United States Securities and Exchange Commission, 1969–1970; elected as a Democrat to the Ninety-fifth and to the eight succeeding Congresses (1977–1995); one of the managers appointed by the House of Representatives in 1986 to conduct the impeachment proceedings against Harry E. Claiborne, judge of the United States District Court for Nevada; chair, Permanent Select Committee on Intelligence (One Hundred Third Congress); chaired the House Permanent Select Committee on Intelligence; launched an inquiry into the Aldrich Ames spy case; United States Secretary of Agriculture; president and CEO of the MPAA in 2004
James William Good (LAW: JD 1893), Congressional Representative from Iowa; elected as a Republican to the Sixty-first and to the six succeeding Congresses and served 1909–1921; chairman, Committee on Appropriations (Sixty-sixth and Sixty-seventh Congresses); appointed Secretary of War in the Cabinet of President Hoover and served from 1929 until his death in 1929
James F. Goodrich (B.S. 1937), Under Secretary of the Navy 1981–1987
John L. Henshaw (SPH: M.P.H. 1974), assistant secretary of labor for occupational safety and health, heading up the Occupational Safety and Health Administration
George M. Humphrey, United States Secretary of the Treasury during the Eisenhower administration
Arthur M. Hyde (BA 1899), Governor of Missouri, 1921–25; US Secretary of Agriculture (1929–33)
Broderick D. Johnson is a partner at Bryan Cave. Johnson was an Assistant to the President and the former White House Cabinet Secretary for President Barack Obama. 
Philip Lader (M.A.) served as a member of President Clinton's Cabinet as Administrator of the US Small Business Administration, Assistant to the President, White House Deputy Chief of Staff, and Deputy Director of the US Office of Management and Budget.
Robert P. Lamont (BSCE 1891), US Commerce Secretary, 1929–32
George de Rue Meiklejohn (LAW: JD 1880), Congressional Representative from Nebraska; member of the State senate 1884–1888 and served as its president 1886–1888; chairman of the Republican State convention of 1887; chairman of the Republican State central committee in 1887 and 1888; Lieutenant Governor of Nebraska 1889–1891; elected as a Republican to the Fifty-third and Fifty-fourth Congresses (1893–1897); appointed by President McKinley as Assistant Secretary of War in 1897 and served until his resignation in 1901
Julius Sterling Morton (A.B. 1854), United States Secretary of Agriculture under President Cleveland; created Arbor Day
David Norquist (B.A., MPP) United States Secretary of Defense Acting; 34th United States Deputy Secretary of Defense
Tom Price (born October 8, 1954), American physician and Republican politician who was the 23rd United States Secretary of Health and Human Services under the Trump administration.
Mark E. Rey (MA 1976), former timber lobbyist; undersecretary for natural resources and environment at the Agriculture Department; oversees the Forest Service
Harvey S. Rosen (A.B. 1970), Chair of President Bush's Council of Economic Advisers; deputy assistant secretary for tax analysis in the Department of the Treasury under President George H.W. Bush 1989–1991
Kenneth Lee Salazar (LAW: JD 1981), Senator from Colorado; chief legal counsel, Governor Roy Romer of Colorado, 1986–1990; executive director, Colorado Department of Natural Resources 1990–1994; Colorado State attorney general 1999–2005; elected as a Democrat to the U.S. Senate in 2004 for term beginning January 3, 2005; appointed Secretary of the Interior in 2009
Rajiv Shah (B.S.E. (economics), 1995), former Under Secretary of Agriculture for Research, Education, and Economics and Chief Scientist at the United States Department of Agriculture; 16th Administrator of the United States Agency for International Development
Edwin Forrest Sweet (LAW: JD 1874), Congressional Representative from Michigan; mayor of Grand Rapids 1904–1906; elected as a Democrat to the Sixty-second Congress (1911–1913); Assistant Secretary of Commerce 1913–1921
Henry Tang (A.B. 1976), Financial Secretary of Hong Kong, August 4, 2003–present
John F. Turner (MA), reelected in 2007 to board of directors of Peabody Energy; former Assistant Secretary of State for Oceans and International Environmental and Scientific Affairs within the State Department; former president and chief executive officer of the Conservation Fund; Director of the U.S. Fish and Wildlife Service 1989–1993; served 19 years in the Wyoming State Legislature; former president of the Wyoming State Senate; director of International Paper and Ashland, Inc.
Edwin Uhl (MA 1863), United States Secretary of State and Ambassador to Germany during the Cleveland Administration
Edwin Willits (AB 1955), Congressional Representative from Michigan; member of the State board of education 1860–1872; appointed postmaster of Monroe in 1863 by President Lincoln, and removed by President Johnson in 1866; member of the commission to revise the constitution of the State in 1873; elected as a Republican to the Forty-fifth, Forty-sixth, and Forty-seventh Congresses (1877–1883); president of the Michigan Agricultural College 1885–1889; First Assistant Secretary of Agriculture 1889–1893
Donald C. Winter (Ph.D. Physics 1972), President of Northrop Grumman's Mission Systems sector; former president and CEO of TRW Systems; elected to the National Academy of Engineering in 2002; appointed United States Secretary of the Navy in 2006
Hubert Work (MED: 1882–1884), US Interior Secretary, 1923–28

State Senators
As of 2021, Michigan's matriculants include 53 state senators.

Kazuhisa Abe (LAW) (January 18, 1914 – May 18, 1996)[1] was a Democratic state senator and Justice of the Supreme Court of Hawaii.
Elroy M. Avery (LAW: Ph.D. LL.D.) (July 14, 1844 – December 1, 1935) was school principal, politician, author, and historian. Avery was an Ohio State Senator in the 1890s 
Richard J. Barr (LAW) Barr served in the Illinois State Senate 
Albert Berkowitz (AB) Berkowitz was elected on February 14, 1957, to the New York State Senate (37th D.), to fill the vacancy caused by the death of Henry Neddo.[1] He was re-elected three times, and remained in the State Senate until 1964, sitting in the 171st, 172nd, 173rd and 174th New York State Legislatures. 
Kenneth F. Berry He served the 19th District of the Ohio Senate in 1972
Theodore G. Bilbo (LAW) Member of the Mississippi Senate from the 4th district
Mike Bishop (politician) served in the Michigan State Senate from 2003 to 2010 where he served as majority leader
Kate Bolz (born March 1, 1979) is an American politician and social worker who served as a member of the Nebraska Legislature, representing the 29th district from 2013 to 2021 as a state senator. 
John E. Braun (MBA) (born January 16, 1967) is an American businessman, veteran, and politician from Washington. A Republican, Braun serves in the Washington State Senate, representing the 20th district.
Bill Bullard Jr. (BA)  Member of the Michigan Senate from the 15th district  and the 25th district
Martha Hughes Cannon (MED) (July 1, 1857 – July 10, 1932) was a Utah State Senator, physician, Utah women's rights advocate, suffragist, polygamous wife, and a Welsh-born immigrant to the United States.
Charles B. Carter (LAW) He was a lawyer in Maine and also served in the Maine Senate.
George D. Chafee (LAW) Chafee served in the Illinois House of Representatives in 1881 and 1882 and was a Republican. He also served in the Illinois Senate from 1905 to 1909. 
Stephanie Chang (BA, MA, MSW, MPP) is a Democratic politician from Michigan representing the 1st district of the Michigan Senate who served as a State Senator
Patrick Colbeck (BS, MS) is an aerospace engineer, author, former elected official, and former candidate for governor in Michigan. He was born October 7, 1965, in Dearborn, Michigan. He is a former Republican member of the Michigan Senate,
J. Mac Davis (LAW) Davis was elected to the Wisconsin State Senate in 1982, as a Republican, and was re-elected in 1986.
William H. J. Ely (LAW) He was elected to the New Jersey Senate in 1931, defeating Harry Harper,[5] becoming the first Democrat from Bergen County to serve in the Senate in sixteen years
Tom George (BA, MD) (born December 2, 1956) is a Republican politician from the U.S. state of Michigan. As a member[1] of the Michigan State Senate, he represented Kalamazoo County as well as an eastern portion of Van Buren County.
Paul Gillmor (LAW) (born December 2, 1956) is a Republican politician from the U.S. state of Michigan. As a member[1] of the Michigan State Senate, he represented Kalamazoo County as well as an eastern portion of Van Buren County.
Bradley M. Glass (LAW) (January 17, 1931 – August 6, 2015) was an American politician in the state of Illinois. He served in the Illinois Senate from 1973 to 1979, and in the Illinois House of Representatives in 1971. 
Randy Gordon (BA) (born June 29, 1953) was a Democratic Washington State Senator from Bellevue, Washington.
William G. Hare (LAW) In 1920, he was elected to a four-year term in the Oregon State Senate representing District 11. Hare won re-election in 1924 to a second four-year term and remained in office through the 1927 session.
Tom Hayden Member of the California Senate from the 23rd district
Arthur L. Haywood III (LAW) is an American politician from Pennsylvania who served as a Democratic member of the Pennsylvania State Senator for the 4th district.
Kirby Hendee (LAW) Hendee served in the Wisconsin State Senate in 1957 and was a Republican.
Adam Hollier (MUP) is an American politician serving as a member of the Michigan Senate from the 2nd district.
Hoon-Yung Hopgood (BA) Member of the Michigan Senate from the 6th district 8th district (2011-2014)
Gideon S. Ives (LAW) (January 19, 1846 – December 20, 1927) was an American politician who served as Mayor of St. Peter, Minnesota, as Minnesota State Senator and as the 11th Lieutenant Governor of Minnesota.
Tom Johnson (Illinois politician) (BA) (April 30, 1945 – December 3, 2018) was a Republican Illinois State Senator
Marcia A. Karrow (MA) (born March 10, 1959) is an American Republican Party politician who served in the New Jersey State Senate where she represented the 23rd Legislative District
Roger A. Keats (BA) Keats served in the Illinois House of Representatives from 1976 to 1979 and was a Republican. He then served in the Illinois Senate from 1979 to 1993.
John F. Kelly (Michigan politician) (BA) Kelly was elected to the Michigan State Senate in 1978 from Detroit and served four consecutive four-year terms.
Dale Kildee, (MA) he served as a member of the Michigan State Senate from 1975 to 1976.
Antoinette Kinney (BA) was an American politician and community leader who served in the Utah State Senate.
Elbert L. Lampson(LAW) Mr. Lampson served as permanent chairman of the Republican State Convention at Dayton in 1888. In 1891 he was elected to the State Senate to represent the Twenty-fourth and Twenty-sixth districts.
Burton Leland(MSW) Member of the Michigan Senate from the 5th district
Andrew Caldwell Mailer (BA) (April 4, 1853 – December 3, 1909) was an American politician. He was a member of the Wisconsin State Senate
Lance Mason(LAW: JD) Member of the Ohio Senate from
Oscar W. McConkie (May 9, 1887 – April 9, 1966) was a Utah State Senator
Carrie Meek (MS) In 1982, Meek ran for a newly drawn state senate seat based in northern Dade County and became the first African American woman elected to the Florida Senate.
Lyman Decatur Norris (MDNG) Norris (May 4, 1823 to January 6, 1894) was a lawyer, member of the Michigan Constitutional Convention of 1867, and a State Senator from Washtenaw County, Michigan from 1869 to 1871.
Tom Price (American politician) (BA, MD) Member of the Georgia Senate from the 56th district
June Robinson (MPH) (born June 27, 1959) is an American Democratic Party politician. She is a member of the Washington State Senate, representing the 38th Legislative District.
Frank P. Sadler(LAW) Sadler served in the Illinois State Senate from 1919 to 1923
William Sesler(LAW) (April 18, 1928 – May 22, 2017) was a former Democratic member of the Pennsylvania State Senate, serving from 1961 to 1972.
Ken Sikkema(MBA) was the 12th Majority Leader of the Michigan Senate
Fred J. Slater (LAW) He was a member of the New York State Senate (46th D.) from 1929 to 1934, sitting in the 152nd, 153rd, 154th, 155th, 156th and 157th New York State Legislatures.
Alma Wheeler Smith (BA) Member of the Michigan Senate from the 18th district
Gloria Tanner (born July 16, 1935)[1] is a former United States politician and public figure. In 1994 she became the first African American woman to serve as a Colorado state senator.
Laura M. Toy (BGS) On November 5, 2002, Toy was elected to the Michigan Senate where she represented the 6th district from January 8, 2003, to December 31, 2006.
James Franklin Ware (LAW) (1849–1934) was a member of the Wisconsin State Assembly and the Wisconsin State Senate.
Hank Wilkins(BA) Member of the Arkansas Senate from the 5th district
Merrick Wing (LAW)) (September 10, 1833 – April 11, 1895) was a member of the Wisconsin State Senate.
Gerald Van Woerkom (MA)  Member of the Michigan Senate from the 34th district

United States Senator

As of 2020, Michigan matriculants include 47 United States Senators, 33 of whom graduated from the University of Michigan Law School.

John B. Allen (LAW: 1869) served as a US Senator from Washington
Clinton Anderson (1915-1916) served as a US Senator from New Mexico
Henry F. Ashurst (LAW: 1903) served as a US Senator from Arizona
Lucien Baker (LAW) served as a US Senator from Kansas.
Calvin S. Brice (LAW: 1865) served as a US Senator from Ohio
Arthur Brown (U.S. senator) (LAW: 1864) served as a US Senator from Utah.
William J. Bulow (LAW: 1893) served as a US Senator from South Dakota
Don B. Colton (LAW: 1905) served as a US Senator from Utah
Royal S. Copeland (MED: 1889) served as a United States Senator from New York 
Cushman Kellogg Davis (LAW: 1857) served as a US Senator from Minnesota
Sheridan Downey (LAW: LLB 1907) served as a US Senator from California
Homer S. Ferguson (LAW: LLB 1913) served as a United States Senator from Michigan.
Woodbridge N. Ferris (MED 1873–1874) served as a US Senator from Michigan
Ernest Willard Gibson (LAW) served as a US Senator from Vermont
Robert P. Griffin (LAW: 1950) served as a US Senator from Michigan
Philip Hart (LAW: 1937) served as a United States Senator from Michigan
Charles Henderson (Nevada politician) (LAW: 1895) served as a United States Senator from Nevada.
J. Lister Hill (Attended) served as a US Senator from Alabama
Gilbert Hitchcock (LAW: LLB) served as a US Senator from Nebraska
Nancy Kassebaum (MA) served as a US Senator from Kansas
John W. Kern (LAW: LLB) served as a Democratic United States Senator from Indiana. 
William H. King (LAW) served as a United States Senator from Utah
Cyrus Locher (Attended) served as a United States Senator from Ohio.
Oren E. Long (Attended ) served as a US Senator from Hawaii
Porter J. McCumber (LAW: 1880) served as a United States Senator from North Dakota.
Rice W. Means (LAW: 1901) served as a Republican United States Senator from Colorado.
Blair Moody Jr. (LAW: LLB 1952) served as a United States Senator from Michigan.
Thomas W. Palmer (Attended) served as a US Senator from Michigan
Rob Portman (LAW: JD) currently serving as a US Senator from Ohio
Joseph V. Quarles (LAW: LLB 1867) served as a United States Senator from Wisconsin
Donald Riegle (BA) served as a US Senator from Michigan
Donald S. Russell (LAW: 1929) served as a United States Senator from South Carolina
Ken Salazar (LAW: JD 1981), served as a Senator from Colorado
John F. Shafroth (AB: 1875) served as a US Senator from Colorado
Benjamin F. Shively (LAW: 1886) served as US Senator from Indiana
Robert Stafford (Attended) served as a US Senator from Vermont
Ozora P. Stearns (LAW: 1860) served as a US Senator from Minnesota
George Sutherland (LAW) served as a US Senator from Utah
Charles S. Thomas (LAW: LLB) served as a United States Senator from Colorado.
Charles A. Towne (LAW) served as a US Senator from Minnesota
Charles E. Townsend (AB) served as a US senator from Michigan
Arthur Vandenberg (LAW: 1900–1901) served as a US Senator from Michigan
William Warner (Missouri politician) (LAW) served as a US Senator from Missouri
Charles W. Waterman (LAW: 1889) served as a US Senator from Colorado
Adonijah Welch (AB: 1846) served as a United States Senator from Florida 
Burton K. Wheeler (LAW: 1905) served as a United States Senator from Montana
Alexander Wiley (AB) served as a US Senator from Wisconsin

Other
Heidi Li Feldman, law professor
Roberta Karmel (born 1937), Centennial Professor of Law at Brooklyn Law School, and first female Commissioner of the U.S. Securities and Exchange Commission.
Laura A. Woodin Le Valley, admitted to practice before the supreme court of Michigan on November 12, 1881
 Shana Madoff, compliance officer and attorney at securities firm of Ponzi schemer Bernard Madoff
 Teresa Stanek Rea (PHARM, B.S. 1976), Acting Under Secretary of Commerce for Intellectual Property and Acting Director of the United States Patent and Trademark Office
Byron Sylvester Waite was an associate justice of the United States Customs Court and was previously a Member of the Board of General Appraisers.

References

External links
University of Michigan Alumni
Famous U-M Alumni
Alumni association of the University of Michigan
UM Alumni Information

University of Michigan law and government alumni
Law and government